= Athletics at the 2012 Summer Paralympics – Women's 1500 metres =

The Women's 1500m athletics events for the 2012 Summer Paralympics took place at the London Olympic Stadium from 31 August to 8 September. A total of three events were contested over this distance for three different classifications.

== Results ==
=== T12 ===
The T12 category is for athletes with visual impairment. Athletes in this category will generally have some residual sight, the ability to recognise the shape of a hand at a distance of 2 metres and the ability to perceive clearly will be no more than 2/60. T12 athletes commonly run with guides.

The event consisted of a single race. Results:

Rank	Athlete	Country	Class	Time	Notes
1st place, gold medalist(s)	Elena Pautova	Russia	T12	4:37.65	SB
2nd place, silver medalist(s)	Elena Congost	Spain	T12	4:43.53	
3rd place, bronze medalist(s)	Annalisa Minetti; Guide: Andrea Giocondi	Italy	T11	4:48.88	WR
4	Meryem En-Nourhi; Guide: Mustapha Sanjach	Morocco	T12	4:50.94	PB
5	Miroslava Sedlackova; Guide: Michal Prochazka	Czech Republic	T11	4:57.99	PB
6	Maritza Arango Buitrago; Guide: Jonathan Sanchez Gonzalez	Colombia	T11	5:05.72	RR
7	Sumeyye Ozcan; Guide: Ibrahim Kizilkaya	Turkey	T11	5:10.68	PB
8	Maria Fiuza	Portugal	T12	5:21.75	
	Ana Isabel Tavera Gonzalez; Guide: Aldo Gomez Hernandez	Mexico	T12	DQ	

=== T20 ===
The T20 category is for athletes with intellectual impairment. T20 athletes have an IQ score of 75 or less.

The event consisted of a single race. Results:

Rank	Athlete	Country	Time	Notes
1st place, gold medalist(s)	Barbara Niewiedzial	Poland	4:35.26	
2nd place, silver medalist(s)	Arleta Meloch	Poland	4:39.04	
3rd place, bronze medalist(s)	Ilona Biacsi	Hungary	4:42.31	
4	Bernadett Biacsi	Hungary	4:42.80	
5	Sayaka Makita	Japan	4:50.03	SB
6	Aida Naili	Tunisia	4:50.47	SB

=== T54 ===
The T54 category is for wheelchair athletes with no leg function, but near full arm function and reasonable to normal trunk function. Typically this may be caused by a lower spinal cord injury or spinal cord birth defect.

The event consisted of 2 heats and a final. Results of final:

Rank	Athlete	Country	Class	Time	Notes
1st place, gold medalist(s)	Tatyana McFadden	United States	T54	3:36.42	
2nd place, silver medalist(s)	Edith Wolf	Switzerland	T54	3:36.78	
3rd place, bronze medalist(s)	Shirley Reilly	United States	T53	3:37.03	
4	Diane Roy	Canada	T54	3:37.17	
5	Zou Lihong	China	T54	3:37.91	
6	Shelly Woods	Great Britain	T54	3:37.97	
7	Amanda McGrory	United States	T53	3:38.19	
8	Keira-Lyn Frie	Canada	T54	3:38.58	
9	Gunilla Wallengren	Sweden	T54	3:39.02	
10	Jade Jones	Great Britain	T54	3:39.03	
