= 2023 World Para Athletics Championships – Women's 1500 metres =

The women's 1500 metres at the 2023 World Para Athletics Championships were held across 4 classifications at Charlety Stadium, Paris, France, on 10, 13 and 14 July.

== Medalists ==
Event	Gold	Silver	Bronze
T11	Nancy Chelangat Koech; Kenya	Louzanne Coetzee; South Africa	Mary Waithera Njoroge; Kenya
T13	Fatima Ezzahra El Idrissi; Morocco	Liza Corso; United States	Somaya Bousaid; Tunisia
T20	Barbara Bieganowska-Zając; Poland	Antônia Keyla; Brazil	Liudmyla Danylina; Ukraine
T54	Catherine Debrunner; Switzerland	Manuela Schär; Switzerland	Zhou Zhaoqian; China

== T11 ==
The event took place on 10 July.

Rank	Lane	Name	Nationality	Time	Notes
1st place, gold medalist(s)	1	Nancy Chelangat Koech	Kenya	4:22.15	CR
2nd place, silver medalist(s)	2	Louzanne Coetzee	South Africa	4:22.50	SB
3rd place, bronze medalist(s)	6	Mary Waithera Njoroge	Kenya	4:30.98	PB
4	3	Joanna Mazur	Poland	4:33.27	
5	4	Rakshitha Raju	India	4:39.59	SB
6	5	Margarita Faúndez	Chile	5:15.17	SB

== T13 ==
The event took place on 10 July.

Rank	Lane	Sport Class	Name	Nationality	Time	Notes
1st place, gold medalist(s)	7	T12	Fatima Ezzahra El Idrissi	Morocco	4:22.15	CR
2nd place, silver medalist(s)	2	T13	Liza Corso	United States	4:22.50	
3rd place, bronze medalist(s)	3	T13	Somaya Bousaid	Tunisia	4:30.98	SB
	1	T13	Greta Streimikyte	Ireland	4:33.27	AR
	6	T13	Peace Oroma	Uganda	4:39.59	PB
	5	T13	Fairouz Madani	Algeria	5:15.17	PB
	4	T12	Nelly Nasimiyu Munialo	Kenya	DNS	

== T20 ==
The final of this event was held at 19:39 on 14 Jul 2023.

Rank	Lane	Name	Nationality	Time	Notes
1st place, gold medalist(s)	2	Barbara Bieganowska-Zajac	Poland	4:28.66	SB
2nd place, silver medalist(s)	4	Antonia Keyla da Silva	Brazil	4:30.75	AR
3rd place, bronze medalist(s)	9	Danylina Liudmyla	Ukraine	4:32.93	SB
4	6	Hannah Taunton	Great Britain	4:33.07	
5	10	Ilona Biacsi	Hungary	4:42.53	SB
6	8	Kaitlin Bounds	United States	4:45.56	PB
7	5	Yamamoto Moeko	Japan	4:51.49	SB
8	3	Annabelle Colman	Australia	4:52.88	AR
9	1	Bernadett Biacsi	Hungary	5:03.60	SB
10	7	Franziska Dziallas	Germany	5:05.06	

== T54 ==
The event took place on 13 July.

Rank	Lane	Name	Nationality	Time	Notes
1st place, gold medalist(s)	3	Catherine Debrunner	Switzerland	3:22.02	CR
2nd place, silver medalist(s)	5	Manuela Schär	Switzerland	3:22.30	
3rd place, bronze medalist(s)	9	Zhou Zhaoqian	China	3:22.52	
4	1	Patricia Eachus	Switzerland	3:23.02	
5	4	Merle Menje	Germany	3:23.25	
6	7	Eden Rainbow-Cooper	Great Britain	3:24.04	
7	8	Léa Bayekula	Belgium	3:24.18	SB
8	6	Tian Yajuan	China	3:24.26	
9	10	Tatyana McFadden	United States	3:25.95	
10	2	Shauna Bocquet	Ireland	3:31.05	SB
