= Athletics at the 2024 Summer Paralympics – Women's 1500 metres T20 =

Women's 1500 metres T20 at the XVII Paralympic Games
- Venue: Stade de France
- Dates: 6 September 2024
- Competitors: 9 from 8 nations
- Winning time: 4:26.06 SB

Medalists
1st place, gold medalist(s)		Barbara Bieganowska-Zając	Poland
2nd place, silver medalist(s)		Liudmyla Danylina	Ukraine
3rd place, bronze medalist(s)		Antônia Keyla	Brazil

1500 metres at the 2024 Summer Paralympics
Men's · T11 · T13 · T20 · T38 · T46 · T54 · Women's · T11 · T13 · T20 · T54

The women's 1500 metres T20 event at the 2024 Summer Paralympics in Paris, took place on 6 September 2024.

The T20 category is for athletes with intellectual impairment. T20 athletes have an IQ score of 75 or less.

== Records ==
Prior to the competition, the existing records were as follows:

World Record	Barbara Bieganowska-Zając (POL)	4:23.37	(Netherlands) Stadskanaal	28 June 2012
Paralympic Record	Barbara Bieganowska-Zając (POL)	4:24.37	(Brazil) Rio de Janeiro	16 September 2016

Area	Time		Athlete	Location	Date
Africa	4:50.47		(Tunisia) Aida Naili	(United Kingdom) London	5 September 2012
America	4:30.75		(Brazil) Antônia Keyla	(France) Paris	14 July 2023
Asia	4:36.56		(Japan) Anju Furuya	(Japan) Kumagaya	6 September 2020
Europe	4:23.37	WR	(Poland) Barbara Bieganowska-Zając	(Netherlands) Stadskanaal	28 June 2012
Oceania	4:52.88		(Australia) Annabelle Colman	(France) Paris	14 July 2023

== Results ==
=== Final ===
Rank	Athlete	Nation	Time	Notes
1st place, gold medalist(s)	Barbara Bieganowska-Zając	Poland	4:26.06	SB
2nd place, silver medalist(s)	Liudmyla Danylina	Ukraine	4:28.40	PB
3rd place, bronze medalist(s)	Antônia Keyla	Brazil	4:29.40	AR
4	Annabelle Colman	Australia	4:31.54	AR
5	Hannah Taunton	Great Britain	4:38.98	SB
6	Kaitlin Bounds	United States	4:40.30	PB
7	Ilona Biacsi	Hungary	4:54.41	
8	Bernadett Biacsi	Hungary	5:00.12	
9	Moeko Yamamoto	Japan	5:16.70	
