= 2018 World Para Athletics European Championships – Women's 1500 metres =

The women's 1500 metres at the 2018 World Para Athletics European Championships was held at the Friedrich-Ludwig-Jahn-Sportpark in Berlin from 20 to 26 August. 4 events were held over this distance.

== Medalists ==
Event	Gold		Silver		Bronze	
T11	Joanna Mazur (POL) guide : Michal Stawicki	5:19.49	Maria Fiuza (POR) guide : Luis ginja	5:38.47	Öznur Alumur (TUR) guide : Muhammed Emin Tan	5:39.07
T13	Greta Streimikyte (IRL)	4:48.54	Izaskun Oses Ayucar (ESP)	4:59.31	Asli Adali (TUR)	5:19.21
T20	Barbara Niewiedzial (POL)	4:43.33	Liudmyla Danylina (UKR)	4:45.37	Ilona Biacsi (HUN)	4:47.57
T54	Manuela Schär (SUI)	3:33.42 CR	Alexandra Helbling (SUI)	3:48.42	Margriet van den Broek (NED)	3:49.64
WR world record | AR area record | CR championship record | GR games record | NR national record | OR Olympic record | PB personal best | SB season best | WL world leading (in a given season)

== See also ==
- List of IPC world records in athletics
