= Athletics at the 2016 Summer Paralympics – Women's 400 metres T20 =

Women's 400 metres T20 at the XV Paralympic Games
- Venue: Estádio Olímpico João Havelange
- Dates: 13 September 2016
- Competitors: 12 from 8 nations

Medalists
1st place, gold medalist(s)		Breanna Clark	United States
2nd place, silver medalist(s)		Natalia Iezlovetska	Ukraine
3rd place, bronze medalist(s)		Barbara Niewiedzial	Poland

The T20 category is for athletes with intellectual impairment. T20 athletes have an IQ score of 75 or less.

The Athletics at the 2016 Summer Paralympics – Women's 400 metres T20 event at the 2016 Paralympic Games took place on 13 September 2016, at the Estádio Olímpico João Havelange.

== Heats ==
=== Heat 1 ===
17:50 12 September 2016:

Rank	Lane	Bib	Name	Nationality	Reaction	Time	Notes
1	4	893	Breanna Clark	United States	0.155	58.25	Q
2	6	697	Sabina Stenka	Poland	0.231	59.63	Q
3	5	406	Ilona Biacsi	Hungary	0.162	1:00.49	Q
4	8	934	Norkelys Gonzalez	Venezuela	0.258	1:01.18	
5	3	693	Arleta Meloch	Poland		1:01.32	
6	7	250	Katerina Husakova	Czech Republic	0.192	1:01.75	

=== Heat 2 ===
17:56 12 September 2016:

Rank	Lane	Bib	Name	Nationality	Reaction	Time	Notes
1	8	529	Siti Noor Iasah Mohamad Ariffin	Malaysia	0.173	58.96	Q
2	7	875	Natalia Iezlovetska	Ukraine	0.251	59.16	Q
3	3	694	Barbara Niewiedzial	Poland	0.202	59.20	Q
4	4	407	Piroska Csontos	Hungary	0.200	1:00.03	q
5	6	409	Erika Keresztesi	Hungary		1:00.73	q
6	5	710	Carina Paim	Portugal	0.153	1:02.16	

== Final ==
17:46 13 September 2016:

Rank	Lane	Bib	Name	Nationality	Reaction	Time	Notes
1st place, gold medalist(s)	3	893	Breanna Clark	United States	0.154	57.79	
2nd place, silver medalist(s)	4	875	Natalia Iezlovetska	Ukraine	0.207	58.48	
3rd place, bronze medalist(s)	8	694	Barbara Niewiedzial	Poland		58.51	
4	6	529	Siti Noor Iasah Mohamad Ariffin	Malaysia	0.215	58.55	
5	5	697	Sabina Stenka	Poland	0.196	59.27	
6	1	407	Piroska Csontos	Hungary	0.188	59.41	
7	2	409	Erika Keresztesi	Hungary	0.244	1:00.47	
8	7	406	Ilona Biacsi	Hungary	0.141	1:01.13	
