= 2019 World Para Athletics Championships – Women's 1500 metres =

The women's 1500 metres at the 2019 World Para Athletics Championships was held in Dubai on 10, 11, 14 and 15 November 2019.

== Medalists ==
Event	Gold		Silver		Bronze	
T11	Monica Olivia Rodriguez Saavedra; Mexico	4:52.36 PB	He Shanshan; China	4:54.43	Nancy Chelangat Koech; Kenya	4:56.28 SB
T13	Fatima Ezzahra El Idrissi; Morocco	4:39.62	Francy Osorio; Colombia	4:43.49	Elena Pautova; Russia	4:45.85 SB
T20	Barbara Bieganowska; Poland	4:36.10	Liudmyla Danylina; Ukraine	4:40.86	Ilona Biacsi; Hungary	4:43.16
T54	Zou Lihong; China	3:34.09	Madison de Rozario; Australia	3:34.30	Amanda McGrory; United States	3:34.32
WR world record | AR area record | CR championship record | GR games record | NR national record | OR Olympic record | PB personal best | SB season best | WL world leading (in a given season)

== See also ==
- List of IPC world records in athletics
