= 2014 IPC Athletics European Championships – Women's 400 metres =

The women's 400 metres at the 2014 IPC Athletics European Championships was held at the Swansea University Stadium from 18–23 August.

== Medalists ==
Event	Gold		Silver		Bronze	
T11	Öznur Alumur; Turkey	1:04.59	Elisa Montonen; Finland	1:16.00	—	
T12	Oxana Boturchuk; Ukraine	55.04	Anna Sorokina; Russia	58.52	Veronika Zotova; Russia	1:02.36
T13	Nantenin Keita; France	59.46	—		—	
T20	Marianne Verdonk; Netherlands	1:02.29	Erika Keresztesi; Hungary	1:02.67	Ilona Biacsi; Hungary	1:02.83
T37	Evgeniya Trushnikova; Russia	1:06.35	Mandy Francois-Elie; France	1:08.16	Bethany Woodward; Great Britain	1:08.57
T38	Margarita Goncharova; Russia	1:03.40 WR	Sophie Hahn; Great Britain	1:07.16	Inna Stryzhak; Ukraine	1:08.82
T44	Marie-Amélie Le Fur (T44); France	1:01.41 WR	Irmgard Bensusan (T44); Germany	1:01.85	Marlou van Rhijn (T43); Netherlands	1:01.88
T47	Alicja Fiodorow; Poland	1:01.62	—		—	
T53	Samantha Kinghorn; Great Britain	1:04.84	—		—	
T54	Manuela Schär; Switzerland	59.11	Amanda Kotaja; Finland	1:00.22	Gunilla Wallengren; Sweden	1:00.68

== Results ==
=== T11 ===
Final

Rank	Sport Class	Name	Nationality	Time	Notes
1st place, gold medalist(s)	T11	Öznur Alamur	Turkey	1:04.59	PB
2nd place, silver medalist(s)	T11	Elisa Montonen	Finland	1:16.00	
3	T11	Pinar Keles	Turkey	1:16.03	

=== T12 ===
Final

Rank	Sport Class	Name	Nationality	Time	Notes
1st place, gold medalist(s)	T12	Oxana Boturchuk	Ukraine	55.04	PB
2nd place, silver medalist(s)	T12	Anna Sorokina	Russia	58.52	PB
3rd place, bronze medalist(s)	T12	Veronika Zotova	Russia	1:02.36	PB
4	T12	Melani Berges Gamez	Spain	1:02.72	PB

=== T13 ===
Final

Rank	Sport Class	Name	Nationality	Time	Notes
1st place, gold medalist(s)	T13	Nantenin Keita	France	59.46	SB
2	T13	Erin McBride	United Kingdom	1:01.25	

=== T20 ===
Final

Rank	Sport Class	Name	Nationality	Time	Notes
1st place, gold medalist(s)	T20	Marianne Verdonk	Netherlands	1:02.29	PB
2nd place, silver medalist(s)	T20	Erika Keresztesi	Hungary	1:02.67	PB
3rd place, bronze medalist(s)	T20	Ilona Biacsi	Hungary	1:02.83	
4	T20	Claudia Santos	Portugal	1:03.49	PB
5	T20	Shirley Kerkhove	Netherlands	1:04.74	PB
6	T20	Catia Almeida	Portugal	1:07.94	PB
7	T20	Bernadett Biacsi	Hungary	1:08.07	
8	T20	Raquel Cerqueira	Portugal	1:10.10	PB

=== T37 ===
Final

Rank	Sport Class	Name	Nationality	Time	Notes
1st place, gold medalist(s)	T37	Evgeniya Trushnikova	Russia	1:06.35	SB
2nd place, silver medalist(s)	T37	Mandy Francois-Elie	France	1:08.16	PB
3rd place, bronze medalist(s)	T37	Bethany Woodward	United Kingdom	1:08.57	
4	T37	Natalia Jasinska	Poland	1:12.37	
5	T37	Matthildur Thorsteinsdottir	Iceland	1:12.86	PB
6	T37	Viktoriya Kravchenko	Ukraine	1:13.74	
7	T37	Isabelle Foerder	Germany	1:17.55	
8	T37	Maike Hausberger	Germany	1:17.62	

=== T38 ===
Final

Rank	Sport Class	Name	Nationality	Time	Notes
1st place, gold medalist(s)	T38	Margarita Goncharova	Russia	1:03.40	WR
2nd place, silver medalist(s)	T38	Sophie Hahn	United Kingdom	1:07.16	PB
3rd place, bronze medalist(s)	T38	Inna Stryzhak	Ukraine	1:08.82	
4	T38	Maria Fernandes	Portugal	1:12.75	
5	T38	Anezka Vejrazkova	Czech Republic	1:14.43	PB

=== T44 ===
Final

Rank	Sport Class	Name	Nationality	Time	Notes
1st place, gold medalist(s)	T44	Marie-Amelie Le Fur	France	1:01.41	WR
2nd place, silver medalist(s)	T44	Irmgard Bensusan	Germany	1:01.85	PB
3rd place, bronze medalist(s)	T43	Marlou van Rhijn	Netherlands	1:01.88	
4	T44	Marlene van Gansewinkel	Netherlands	1:14.63	

=== T47 ===
Final

Rank	Sport Class	Name	Nationality	Time	Notes
1st place, gold medalist(s)	T47	Alicja Fiodorow	Poland	1:01.62	
2	T46	Alexandra Moguchaya	Russia	1:03.17	

=== T53 ===
Final

Rank	Sport Class	Name	Nationality	Time	Notes
1st place, gold medalist(s)	T53	Samantha Kinghorn	United Kingdom	1:04.84	
2	T53	Hamide Kurt	Turkey	1:05.74	

=== T54 ===
Final

Rank	Sport Class	Name	Nationality	Time	Notes
1st place, gold medalist(s)	T54	Manuela Schär	Turkey	59.11	
2nd place, silver medalist(s)	T54	Amanda Kotaja	Finland	1:00.22	
3rd place, bronze medalist(s)	T54	Gunilla Wallengren	Sweden	1:00.68	
4	T54	Alexandra Helbling	Switzerland	1:02.25	
5	T54	Zubeyde Supurgeci	Turkey	1:06.40	
6	T54	Patricia Keller	Switzerland	1:07.34	
7	T54	Georgina Oliver	United Kingdom	1:08.78	
—	T54	Margriet van den Broek	Netherlands	DQ	

== See also ==
- List of IPC world records in athletics
