= Athletics at the 2016 Summer Paralympics – Women's 1500 metres T11 =

Women's 1500 metres T11 at the XV Paralympic Games
- Venue: Estádio Olímpico João Havelange
- Dates: 17 September 2016
- Competitors: 11 from 11 nations

Medalists
1st place, gold medalist(s)		Jin Zheng	China
2nd place, silver medalist(s)		Nancy Chelangat Koech	Kenya
3rd place, bronze medalist(s)		Maritza Arango Buitrago	Colombia

The T11 category is for athletes with a visual impairment. A T11 athlete may be entirely without sight, or be able to perceive light, but have no ability to see the shape of a hand at any distance. T11 athletes commonly run with guides.

The Athletics at the 2016 Summer Paralympics – Women's 1500 metres T11 event at the 2016 Paralympic Games took place on 17 September 2016, at the Estádio Olímpico João Havelange.

== Heats ==
=== Heat 1 ===
12:43 15 September 2016:

Rank	Lane	Bib	Name	Nationality	Reaction	Time	Notes
1	5	186	Jin Zheng	China		4:47.36	Q
2	4	486	Nancy Chelangat Koech	Kenya		4:48.70	Q
3	1	96	Renata Bazone Teixeira	Brazil		5:06.09	q
4	3	847	Öznur Alumur	Turkey		5:14.19	
	2	734	Louzanne Coetzee	South Africa			DSQ

=== Heat 2 ===
12:51 15 September 2016:

Rank	Lane	Bib	Name	Nationality	Reaction	Time	Notes
1	6	210	Maritza Arango Buitrago	Colombia		4:58.43	Q
2	1	555	Monica Olivia Rodriguez Saavedra	Mexico		5:01.47	Q
3	4	911	Ivonne Mosquera-Schmidt	United States		5:12.28	q
4	5	13	Befilia Buya	Angola		5:24.01	
5	3	708	Maria Fiuza	Portugal		5:24.14	
6	2	154	Paula Guzman	Chile		5:37.26	

== Final ==
17:38 17 September 2016:

Rank	Lane	Bib	Name	Nationality	Reaction	Time	Notes
1st place, gold medalist(s)	5	186	Jin Zheng	China		4:38.92	
2nd place, silver medalist(s)	4	486	Nancy Chelangat Koech	Kenya		4:42.12	
3rd place, bronze medalist(s)	3	210	Maritza Arango Buitrago	Colombia		4:45.33	
4	2	96	Renata Bazone Teixeira	Brazil		5:01.75	
5	1	555	Monica Olivia Rodriguez Saavedra	Mexico		5:03.14	
6	6	911	Ivonne Mosquera-Schmidt	United States		5:08.97	
