= 2018 World Para Athletics European Championships – Women's 800 metres =

The women's 800 metres at the 2018 World Para Athletics European Championships was held at the Friedrich-Ludwig-Jahn-Sportpark in Berlin from 20 to 26 August. 3 events were held over this distance.

== Medalists ==
Event	Gold		Silver		Bronze	
T20	Barbara Niewiedzial (POL)	2:15.79 WR	Liudmyla Danylina (UKR)	2:16.83	Ilona Biacsi (HUN)	2:17.57
T34	Hannah Cockroft (GBR)	2:14.21 CR	Kare Adenegan (GBR)	2:14.38	no medal awarded	
T54	Margriet van den Broek (NED)	2:05.53	Alexandra Helbling (SUI)	2:05.95	Hamide Kurt (TUR)	2:06.13
WR world record | AR area record | CR championship record | GR games record | NR national record | OR Olympic record | PB personal best | SB season best | WL world leading (in a given season)

== See also ==
- List of IPC world records in athletics
