= 2017 World Para Athletics Championships – Women's 1500 metres =

The women's 1500 metres at the 2017 World Para Athletics Championships was held at the Olympic Stadium in London from 14 to 23 July.

== Medalists ==
Event	Gold		Silver		Bronze	
T11	Joanna Mazur; Guide: Michal Stawicki; Poland	4:50.95 PB	Maritza Arango Buitrago; Guide: Jonathan Daybes Sanchez Gonzalez; Colombia	4:51.19 SB	Zheng Jin; Guide: Wang Zipeng; China	4:51.40
T13	Sanaa Benhama; Morocco	4:40.40 PB	Somaya Bousaid; Tunisia	4:40.89	Najah Chouaya; Tunisia	4:46.16 SB
T20	Barbara Niewiedział; Poland	4:33.82	Liudmyla Danylina; Ukraine	4:35.08	Ilona Biacsi; Hungary	4:36.73 SB
T54	Tatyana McFadden; United States	3:25.23 CR	Amanda McGrory; United States	3:25.43	Madison de Rozario; Australia	3:25.56
WR world record | AR area record | CR championship record | GR games record | NR national record | OR Olympic record | PB personal best | SB season best | WL world leading (in a given season)

Events listed in pink were contested but no medals were awarded.

== See also ==
- List of IPC world records in athletics
