= Athletics at the 2016 Summer Paralympics – Women's 1500 metres T20 =

Women's 1500 metres T20 at the XV Paralympic Games
- Venue: Estádio Olímpico João Havelange
- Dates: 16 September 2016
- Competitors: 8 from 4 nations

Medalists
1st place, gold medalist(s)		Barbara Niewiedzial	Poland
2nd place, silver medalist(s)		Ilona Biacsi	Hungary
3rd place, bronze medalist(s)		Liudmyla Danylina	Ukraine

The T20 category is for athletes with intellectual impairment. T20 athletes have an IQ score of 75 or less.

The Athletics at the 2016 Summer Paralympics – Women's 1500 metres T20 event at the 2016 Paralympic Games took place on 16 September 2016, at the Estádio Olímpico João Havelange.

== Final ==
11:09 16 September 2016:

Rank	Lane	Bib	Name	Nationality	Reaction	Time	Notes
1st place, gold medalist(s)	4	694	Barbara Niewiedzial	Poland		4:24.37	
2nd place, silver medalist(s)	8	406	Ilona Biacsi	Hungary		4:27.88	
3rd place, bronze medalist(s)	3	873	Liudmyla Danylina	Ukraine		4:28.78	
4	6	693	Arleta Meloch	Poland		4:33.19	
5	2	405	Bernadett Biacsi	Hungary		4:43.10	
6	7	469	Sayaka Makita	Japan		4:51.90	
7	5	480	Moeko Yamamoto	Japan		5:01.99	
	1	697	Sabina Stenka	Poland			DSQ
