= Athletics at the 2020 Summer Paralympics – Women's 1500 metres T11 =

Women's 1500 metres T11 at the XVI Paralympic Games
- Venue: Tokyo National Stadium
- Dates: 29 August 2021 (heats); 30 August 2021 (final)
- Competitors: 11 from 9 nations
- Winning time: 4:37.40

Medalists
1st place, gold medalist(s)		Mónica Olivia Rodríguez	Mexico
2nd place, silver medalist(s)		Louzanne Coetzee	South Africa
3rd place, bronze medalist(s)		Nancy Chelangat Koech	Kenya

The women's 1500 metres T11 event at the 2020 Summer Paralympics in Tokyo took place between 29 and 30 August 2021.

The T11 category is for athletes with a visual impairment. A T11 athlete may be entirely without sight, or be able to perceive light, but have no ability to see the shape of a hand at any distance. T11 athletes commonly run with guides.

== Records ==
Prior to the competition, the existing records were as follows:

World record	Zheng Jin (CHN)	4:38.92	Rio de Janeiro, Brazil	17 September 2016
Paralympic record	Zheng Jin (CHN)	4:38.92	Rio de Janeiro, Brazil	17 September 2016

Area	Time	Athlete	Nation
Africa	4:42.12	Nancy Chelangat Koech	Kenya
America	4:47.98	Maritza Arango Buitrago	Colombia
Asia	4:38.92 WR	Zheng Jin	China
Europe	4:48.88	Annalisa Minetti	Italy
Oceania	Vacant		

== Results ==
=== Heats ===
Heat 1 took place on 29 August 2021, at 9:39:

Rank	Name	Nationality	Time	Notes
1	Mónica Olivia Rodríguez	Mexico	4:47.27	Q, AR
2	He Shanshan	China	4:52.40	Q, PB
3	Mary Waithera Njoroge	Kenya	4:52.54	PB
4	Havva Elmalı	Turkey	5:38.98	
5	Margarita Faundez	Chile	5:46.50	SB

Heat 2 took place on 29 August 2021, at 9:50:

Rank	Name	Nationality	Time	Notes
1	Louzanne Coetzee	South Africa	4:49.24	Q, PB
2	Susana Rodríguez	Spain	4:51.38	Q, PB
3	Joanna Mazur	Poland	4:51.67	q, SB
4	Nancy Chelangat Koech	Kenya	4:51.68	q, SB
5	Diana Coraza	Mexico	5:38.83	
	Arlen Hidalgo	Nicaragua	DNS	

=== Final ===
The final took place on 30 August 2021, at 9:38:

Rank	Name	Nationality	Time	Notes
1st place, gold medalist(s)	Mónica Olivia Rodríguez	Mexico	4:37.40	WR
2nd place, silver medalist(s)	Louzanne Coetzee	South Africa	4:40.96	AR
3rd place, bronze medalist(s)	Nancy Chelangat Koech	Kenya	4:45.58	SB
4	Joanna Mazur	Poland	4:48.74	AR
5	Susana Rodríguez	Spain	4:52.67	
6	He Shanshan	China	4:52.72	
