= Athletics at the 2008 Summer Paralympics – Women's 1500 metres T13 =

The Women's 1,500m T12-13 had its Final was held on September 14 at 10:15. The 6 first places where in exactly the same other as the 800 metres event.

== Medalists ==
Gold	Somaya Bousaid; Tunisia
Silver	Assia El'Hannouni; France
Bronze	Elena Pautova; Russia

== Results ==
Place	Athlete	Class	Final A
1	Somaya Bousaid (TUN)	T13	4:14.00
2	Assia El'Hannouni (FRA)	T12	4:19.20 WR
3	Elena Pautova (RUS)	T12	4:32.91
4	Rima Batalova (RUS)	T12	4:44.21
5	Miroslava Sedlackova (CZE)	T11	4:53.78
6	Elena Congost (ESP)	T12	4:54.50
7	Nelly Nasimiyu Munialo (KEN)	T12	4:56.88
8	Odete Fiuza (POR)	T12	5:03.51
