= Athletics at the 2020 Summer Paralympics – Women's 1500 metres T20 =

Women's 1500 metres T20 at the XVI Paralympic Games
- Venue: Tokyo National Stadium
- Dates: 3 September 2021 (final)
- Competitors: 8 from 5 nations
- Winning time: 4:27.84

Medalists
1st place, gold medalist(s)		Barbara Bieganowska-Zajac	Poland
2nd place, silver medalist(s)		Liudmyla Danylina	Ukraine
3rd place, bronze medalist(s)		Hannah Taunton	Great Britain

The women's 1500 metres T20 event at the 2020 Summer Paralympics in Tokyo took place on 3 September 2021.

The T20 category is for athletes with intellectual impairment. T20 athletes have an IQ score of 75 or less.

== Records ==
Prior to the competition, the existing records were as follows:

World Record	Barbara Bieganowska-Zajac (POL)	4:23.37	Stadskanaal, Netherlands	28 June 2012
Paralympic Record	Barbara Bieganowska-Zajac (POL)	4:24.37	Rio de Janeiro, Brazil	16 September 2016

Area	Time	Athlete	Nation
Africa	4:50.47	Aida Naili	Tunisia
America	4:54.58	Kaitlin Bounds	United States
Asia	4:36.56	Anju Furuya	Japan
Europe	4:23.37 WR	Barbara Bieganowska-Zajac	Poland
Oceania	5:26.86	Eliesha Byrt	Australia

== Results ==
The final took place on 3 September 2021, at 10:26:

Rank	Name	Nationality	Time	Notes
1st place, gold medalist(s)	Barbara Bieganowska-Zajac	Poland	4:27.84	SB
2nd place, silver medalist(s)	Liudmyla Danylina	Ukraine	4:32.82	SB
3rd place, bronze medalist(s)	Hannah Taunton	Great Britain	4:35.34	PB
4	Anju Furuya	Japan	4:38.58	SB
5	Ilona Biacsi	Hungary	4:53.36	
6	Sayaka Makita	Japan	4:54.60	
7	Moeko Yamamoto	Japan	4:55.03	
8	Bernadett Biacsi	Hungary	4:58.41	
