= 2015 IPC Athletics World Championships – Women's 1500 metres =

The women's 1,500 metres at the 2015 IPC Athletics World Championships was held at the Suheim Bin Hamad Stadium in Doha from 22–31 October.

== Medalists ==
| Event | Gold | | Silver | | Bronze | |
|---|---|---|---|---|---|---|
| T11 | Zheng Jin; Guide: Jin Yubo; China | 4:47.71 CR | Maritza Arango Buitrago; Guide: Jonathan Daybes Sanchez Gonzalez; Colombia | 4:49.03 AR | Renata Bazone Teixeira; Guide: Fernando Ribeiro Junior; Brazil | 4:59.93 PB |
| T13 | Somaya Bousaid (T13); Tunisia | 4:33.51 | Elena Pautova (T12); Guide: Grigoriy Andreev; Russia | 4:41.50 SB | Margarita Faundez (T12); Guide: Rodrigo Mellado; Chile | 4:51.88 PB |
| T20 | Barbara Niewiedzial; Poland | 4:28.58 CR | Arleta Meloch; Poland | 4:34.05 PB | Lyudmyla Danylina; Ukraine | 4:37.27 SB |
| T54 | Zhou Hongzhuan (T53); China | 3:40.87 | Gunilla Wallengren (T54); Sweden | 3:41.89 | Madison de Rozario (T53); Australia | 3:42.03 |
WR world record | AR area record | CR championship record | GR games record | NR national record | OR Olympic record | PB personal best | SB season best | WL world leading (in a given season)

== See also ==
- List of IPC world records in athletics
