= 2018 World Para Athletics European Championships – Women's 400 metres =

The women's 400 metres at the 2018 World Para Athletics European Championships was held at the Friedrich-Ludwig-Jahn-Sportpark in Berlin from 20–26 August. RaceRunning events (running events involving adapted tricycle frames for athletes with severe balance difficulties) were included for the first time as RR1 and RR3 events. 9 classification finals are held in all over this distance.

== Medalists ==
Event	Gold		Silver		Bronze	
T11	Joanna Mazur (POL) guide :Michal Stawiki	1:03.67	Öznur Alumur (TUR) guide: Muhammed Emin Tan	1:06.30	Itxaso Munguira (ESP) guide: Aitor Finez Maranon	1:11.52
T12	Oksana Boturchuk (UKR) guide: Vitali Butrym	56.33	Melani Bergés Gámez (ESP) guide :Sergio Palancar Sanchez	59.33	Katrin Mueller-Rottgardt (GER) guide :Alexander Kosenkow	1:02.99
T13	Carolina Duarte (POR)	56.64 CR	Leilia Adzhametova (UKR)	57.30	Nathalie Nilsson (SWE)	1:02.91
T20	Carina Paim (POR)	57.29 ER	Yuliia Shuliar (UKR)	58.59	Natalia Iezlovetska (UKR)	59.03
T37	Nataliia Kobzar (UKR)	1:05.24 CR	Manon Genest (FRA)	1:06.25	Laure Ustaritz (FRA)	1:11.80
T38	Lindy Ave (GER)	1:04.12	Ali Smith (GBR)	1:04.95	Maria Fernandes (POR)	1:10.37
T47 (non-medal)	Angelina Lanza (FRA)	1:03.26	Sally Brown (GBR)	1:04.25		
T53	Hamide Kurt (TUR)	57.76 CR	Zeynep Acet (TUR)	1:09.62	Tanja Henseler (SUI)	1:12.32
T54	Alexandra Helbling (SUI)	58.64 CR	Margriet van der Broek (NED)	59.18	Patricia Keller (SUI)	1:04.89
WR world record | AR area record | CR championship record | GR games record | NR national record | OR Olympic record | PB personal best | SB season best | WL world leading (in a given season)

== See also ==
- List of IPC world records in athletics
