= 2025 World Para Athletics Championships – Women's 1500 metres =

The women's 1500 metres events at the 2025 World Para Athletics Championships were held at the Jawaharlal Nehru Stadium, Delhi in New Delhi.

== Medalists ==
Event	Gold	Silver	Bronze
T11	Neri Mamani; Peru	Nancy Chelangat Koech; Kenya	Joanna Mazur; Poland
T13	Greta Streimikyte; Ireland	Izaskun Osés Ayúcar; Spain	Elena Pautova; Neutral Paralympic Athletes
T20	Antônia Keyla Barros; Brazil	Barbara Bieganowska-Zając; Poland	Annabelle Colman; Australia
T54	Catherine Debrunner; Switzerland	Zhou Zhaoqian; China	Melanie Woods; Great Britain

== T11 ==
Final

The event took place on 28 September.

Rank	Name	Nationality	Class	Time	Notes
1st place, gold medalist(s)	Neri Mamani	Peru	T11	4:59.93	SB
2nd place, silver medalist(s)	Nancy Chelangat Koech	Kenya	T11	5:01.38	SB
3rd place, bronze medalist(s)	Joanna Mazur	Poland	T11	5:02.21	
4	Ana Varela Mosteiro	Spain	T11	5:17.14	
	Merve Nur Çağıran	Turkey	T11	DNF	
	Priscah Jepkemei	Kenya	T11	DQ	

== T13 ==
Final

The event took place on 28 September.

Rank	Name	Nationality	Class	Time	Notes
1st place, gold medalist(s)	Greta Streimikyte	Ireland	T12	4:39.62	
2nd place, silver medalist(s)	Izaskun Osés Ayúcar	Spain	T12	4:51.12	SB
3rd place, bronze medalist(s)	Elena Pautova	Neutral Paralympic Athletes	T13	4:51.69	SB
4	Veronika Kubarko	Neutral Paralympic Athletes	T13	4:51.74	SB
5	Susana Guisado Rodriguez	Spain	T12	4:58.57	PB
6	Lucile Razet	France	T13	5:05.55	

== T20 ==
Final

The event took place on 2 October.

Rank	Name	Nationality	Class	Time	Notes
1st place, gold medalist(s)	Antônia Keyla Barros	Brazil	T20	4:19.22	WR
2nd place, silver medalist(s)	Barbara Bieganowska-Zając	Poland	T20	4:29.60	SB
3rd place, bronze medalist(s)	Annabelle Colman	Australia	T20	4:35.56	SB
4	Hannah Taunton	Great Britain	T20	4:42.95	
5	Kako Okano	Japan	T20	4:47.15	SB
6	Kaitlin Bounds	United States	T20	4:49.14	
7	Yuna Fujiwara	Japan	T20	4:56.75	
8	Florianne Lantoine	France	T20	5:06.74	
9	Pavlína Absolonová	Czech Republic	T20	5:10.89	PB

== T54 ==
Final

The event took place on 1 October.

Rank	Name	Nationality	Class	Time	Notes
1st place, gold medalist(s)	Catherine Debrunner	Switzerland	T53	3:16.81	CR
2nd place, silver medalist(s)	Zhou Zhaoqian	China	T54	3:17.41	AS
3rd place, bronze medalist(s)	Melanie Woods	Great Britain	T54	3:19.75	
4	Tian Yajuan	China	T54	3:21.24	SB
5	Noemi Alphonse	Mauritius	T54	3:22.08	SB
6	Patricia Eachus	Switzerland	T54	3:38.05	
7	Lucía Montenegro	Argentina	T54	3:51.44	
