= 2016 IPC Athletics European Championships – Women's 1500 metres =

The women's 1,500 metres at the 2016 IPC Athletics European Championships was held at the Stadio Olimpico Carlo Zecchini in Grosseto from 11 to 16 June.

== Medalists ==
Event	Gold		Silver		Bronze	
T11	Öznur Alumur; Ahmet Tas (guide); Turkey	5:15.32 PB	Maria Fiuza; Jose Ferreira (guide); Portugal	5:21.46 SB	—	
T13	Elena Pautova (T12); Grigoriy Andreev (guide); Russia	4:41.15	Izaskun Oses Ayucar (T12); Spain	4:48.15 PB	Greta Streimikyte; Ireland	4:54.25
T20	Barbara Niewiedzial; Poland	4:34.62	Ilona Biacsi; Hungary	4:36.16 SB	Arleta Meloch; Poland	4:37.78
T54	Natalia Kocherova; Russia	3:32.28 CR	Akzhana Abdikarimova; Russia	3:35.91 PB	Gunilla Wallengren; Sweden	3:36.03
WR world record | AR area record | CR championship record | GR games record | NR national record | OR Olympic record | PB personal best | SB season best | WL world leading (in a given season)

== See also ==
- List of IPC world records in athletics
