= 2011 IPC Athletics World Championships – Women's 1500 metres =

The women's 1500 metres at the 2011 IPC Athletics World Championships was held at the QEII Stadium from 25–28 January 2011.

== Medalists ==
Class	Gold	Silver	Bronze
T12	Elena Pautova; Russia	Elena Congost; Spain	Rima Batalova; Russia
T13	Somaya Bousaid; Tunisia	Zheng Jin; China	—N/a
T20	Arleta Meloch; Poland	Barbara Niewiedzial; Poland	Lyudmyla Danylina; Ukraine
T54	Tatyana McFadden; United States	Diane Roy; Canada	Wakako Tsuchida; Japan
