= Athletics at the 2012 Summer Paralympics – Women's 1500 metres T20 =

Women's 1500 metres T20 at the XIV Paralympic Games
- Venue: London Olympic Stadium
- Dates: 5 September
- Competitors: 6 from 4 nations
- Winning time: 4:35.26

Medalists
1st place, gold medalist(s)		Barbara Niewiedzial	Poland
2nd place, silver medalist(s)		Arleta Meloch	Poland
3rd place, bronze medalist(s)		Ilona Biacsi	Hungary

The Women's 1500 metres T20 event at the 2012 Summer Paralympics took place at the London Olympic Stadium on 5 September. The event consisted of a single race.

The T20 category is for athletes with intellectual impairment. T20 athletes have an IQ score of 75 or less.

== Records ==
Prior to the competition, the existing World and Paralympic records were as follows:

World record	Arleta Meloch (POL)	4:33.16	8 July 2001	Tunis, Tunisia
Paralympic record	Not previously competed			

== Results ==
Competed 5 September 2012 at 20:19.

Rank	Athlete	Country	Time	Notes
1st place, gold medalist(s)	Barbara Niewiedzial	Poland	4:35.26	
2nd place, silver medalist(s)	Arleta Meloch	Poland	4:39.04	
3rd place, bronze medalist(s)	Ilona Biacsi	Hungary	4:42.31	
4	Bernadett Biacsi	Hungary	4:42.80	
5	Sayaka Makita	Japan	4:50.03	SB
6	Aida Naili	Tunisia	4:50.47	SB

Q = qualified by place. q = qualified by time.
