= Zhou Hongzhuan =

Chinese Paralympic athlete (born 1988)

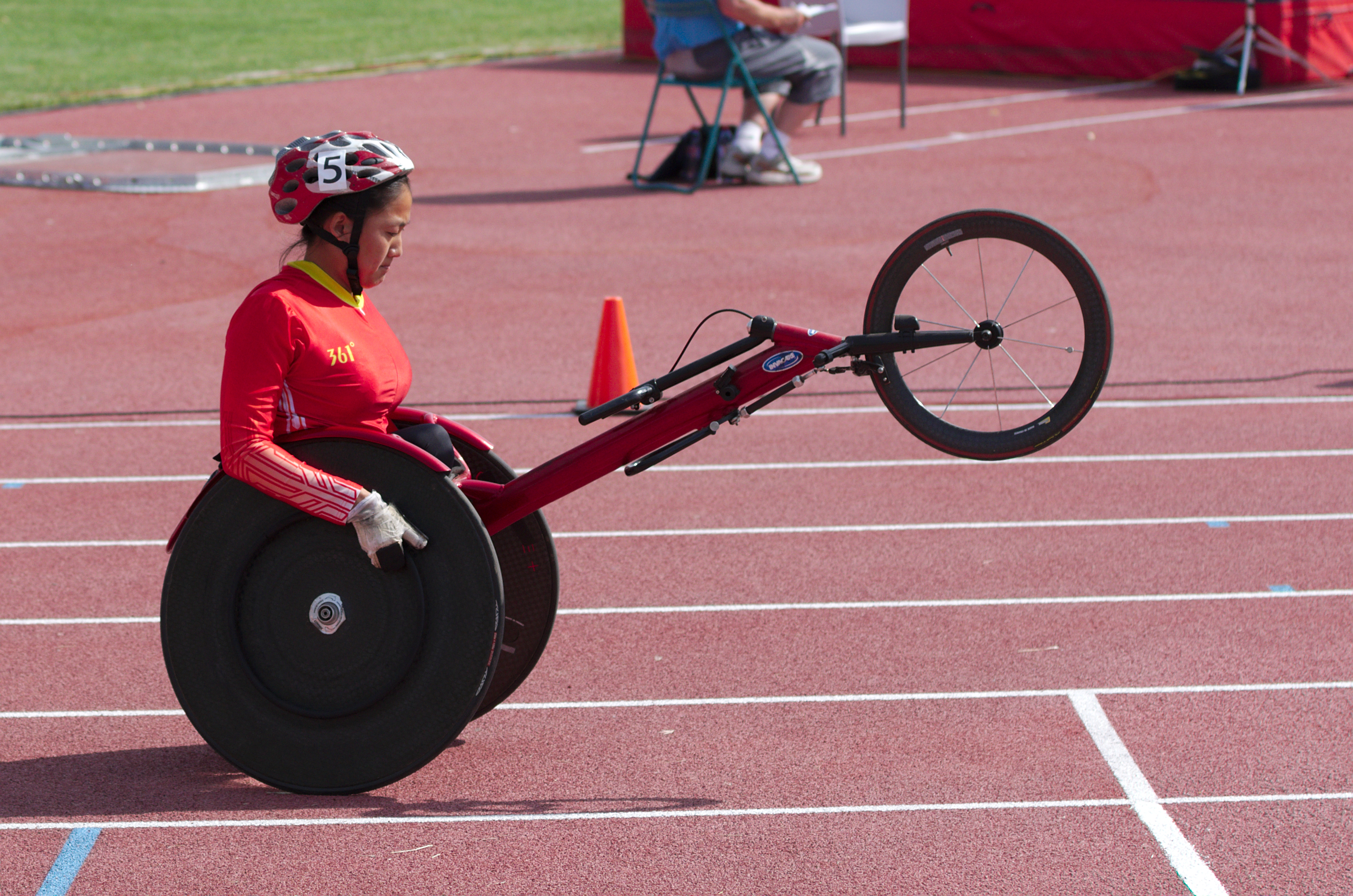
- Zhou at the 2013 World Championships

Personal information
- Native name: 周洪转
- Nationality: Chinese
- Born: 12 December 1988 (age 37) Hebei, China

Sport
- Country: China
- Sport: Para-athletics
- Disability: Polio
- Disability class: T53
- Club: Hebei Para-Athletics Team
Medal record
Women's para-athletics
Representing China
Paralympic Games
Gold medal – first place	2008 Beijing	800m T53
Gold medal – first place	2012 London	400m T53
Gold medal – first place	2012 London	800m T53
Gold medal – first place	2016 Rio de Janeiro	800m T53
Gold medal – first place	2016 Rio de Janeiro	4 × 400 m T53/54
Silver medal – second place	2008 Beijing	400m T53
Silver medal – second place	2012 London	100m T53
Silver medal – second place	2020 Tokyo	100m T53
Silver medal – second place	2020 Tokyo	800m T53
Bronze medal – third place	2008 Beijing	200m T53
Bronze medal – third place	2012 London	200m T53
Bronze medal – third place	2020 Tokyo	400m T53
Bronze medal – third place	2024 Paris	400m T53
Bronze medal – third place	2024 Paris	800m T53
World Championships
Gold medal – first place	2011 Christchurch	4 × 400 m relay T53–54
Gold medal – first place	2013 Lyon	400m relay T53–54
Gold medal – first place	2013 Lyon	800m T53–54
Gold medal – first place	2015 Doha	1500m T54
Gold medal – first place	2015 Doha	4 × 400 m relay T53–54
Gold medal – first place	2024 Kobe	100m T53
Gold medal – first place	2024 Kobe	400m T53
Gold medal – first place	2024 Kobe	800m T53
Silver medal – second place	2006 Assen	100m T53
Silver medal – second place	2011 Christchurch	800m T53
Silver medal – second place	2015 Doha	400m T53
Silver medal – second place	2015 Doha	800m T53
Silver medal – second place	2015 Doha	5000m T53
Silver medal – second place	2025 New Delhi	800m T53
Bronze medal – third place	2011 Christchurch	100m T53
Bronze medal – third place	2011 Christchurch	200m T53
Bronze medal – third place	2023 Paris	400m T53
Bronze medal – third place	2025 New Delhi	100m T53
Bronze medal – third place	2025 New Delhi	400m T53
Asian Para Games
Gold medal – first place	2010 Guangzhou	400m T53
Gold medal – first place	2014 Incheon	400m T53
Gold medal – first place	2014 Incheon	800m T53
Gold medal – first place	2014 Incheon	1500m T54
Gold medal – first place	2018 Jakarta	100m T53
Gold medal – first place	2018 Jakarta	200m T53
Gold medal – first place	2018 Jakarta	400m T53
Gold medal – first place	2018 Jakarta	800m T53
Silver medal – second place	2010 Guangzhou	200m T53
Bronze medal – third place	2010 Guangzhou	100m T53

Zhou Hongzhuan (Chinese: 周洪转; pinyin: Zhōu Hóngzhuǎn; born December 12, 1988) is a Chinese Paralympic athlete competing mainly in category T53 sprint and mid-distance events.

== Career ==
Zhou was born in Huangye in 1988 and she caught polio when she was three years old. She started to compete in wheelchair racing in 2004.

She competed in the 2008 Summer Paralympics in Beijing, China. There she won a gold medal in the women's 800 m T53, a silver medal in the women's 400 m T53 and a bronze medal in the women's 200 m T53.

At the 2012 Summer Paralympics in London, United Kingdom she won a silver medal in the women's 100 m T53, a bronze medal in the women's 200 m T53, a gold medal in the women's 400 m T53 and a gold medal in the 800 m T53.

In the 2016 Summer Paralympics in Rio she gained three more gold medals and a silver in T53 events. 2020 was meant to be her last Paralympics so she had to be patient when the Tokyo games were postponed by a year.
