= Antônia Keyla =

Brazilian Paralympic athlete (born 1994)

Personal information
- Full name: Antônia Keyla da Silva Barros
- Born: 20 September 1994 (age 31) Água Branca, Piauí, Brazil

Sport
- Country: Brazil
- Sport: Para-athletics
- Disability class: T20
- Event: 1500 metres
Medal record
Women's para-athletics
Representing Brazil
Paralympic Games
Bronze medal – third place	2024 Paris	1500 m T20
World Championships
Gold medal – first place	2025 New Delhi	1500 m T20
Silver medal – second place	2023 Paris	1500 m T20
Silver medal – second place	2024 Kobe	1500 m T20

Antônia Keyla da Silva Barros (born 20 September 1994) is a Brazilian T20 Paralympic middle distance runner who represented Brazil at the 2024 Summer Paralympics.

== Career ==
Keyla made her international debut for Brazil at the 2023 World Para Athletics Championships and won a silver medal in the 1500 metres T20 event and again competed at the 2024 World Para Athletics Championships and won a silver medal in the 1500 metres T20 event.

Keyla represented Brazil at the 2024 Summer Paralympics and won a bronze medal in the 1500 metres T20 event.
