= 2014 IPC Athletics European Championships – Women's 1500 metres =

The Women's 1500 metres at the 2014 IPC Athletics European Championships was held at the Swansea University Stadium from 18–23 August. Only final events were contested; no heats events were taken part.

== Medalists ==
Event	Gold		Silver		Bronze	
T12	Elena Pautova; Russia	4:39.87	Maria Fiuza; Portugal	5:26.25	Mari Paredes Rodriguez; Spain	5:55.32
T20	Ilona Biacsi; Hungary	4:59.33	Bernadett Biacsi; Hungary	5:00.71	Cátia Almeida; Portugal	5:03.98
T54	Manuela Schaer; Switzerland	3:55.00	Gunilla Wallengren; Sweden	4:07.86	Patricia Keller; Switzerland	4:09.40

== Results ==
=== T12 ===
Final

Rank	Sport Class	Name	Nationality	Time	Notes
1st place, gold medalist(s)	T12	Elena Pautova	Russia	4:39.87	
2nd place, silver medalist(s)	T12	Maria Fiuza	Portugal	5:26.25	
3rd place, bronze medalist(s)	T12	Mari Paredes Rodriguez	Spain	5:55.43	
—	T11	Pinar Keles	Turkey	DNF	

=== T20 ===
Final

Rank	Sport Class	Name	Nationality	Time	Notes
1st place, gold medalist(s)	T20	Ilona Biacsi	Hungary	4:59.33	
2nd place, silver medalist(s)	T20	Bernadett Biacsi	Hungary	5:00.71	
3rd place, bronze medalist(s)	T20	Cátia Almeida	Portugal	5:03.98	SB
4	T20	Shirley Kerkhove	Netherlands	5:04.38	PB
5	T20	Mariia Koltcova	Russia	5:10.11	

=== T54 ===
Final

Rank	Sport Class	Name	Nationality	Time	Notes
1st place, gold medalist(s)	T54	Manuela Schaer	Switzerland	3:55.00	
2nd place, silver medalist(s)	T54	Gunilla Wallengren	Sweden	4:07.86	
3rd place, bronze medalist(s)	T54	Patricia Keller	Switzerland	4:09.40	
4	T54	Jade Jones	Great Britain	4:10.01	
5	T54	Shelly Woods	Great Britain	4:10.61	
—	T54	Alexandra Helbling	Switzerland	DNS	

== See also ==
- List of IPC world records in athletics
