= 2015 IPC Athletics World Championships – Women's marathon =

The women's marathon at the 2015 IPC Athletics World Championships was held in the streets of London on 26 April as part of the 2015 London Marathon.

== Classification ==
Athletes were given a classification depending on the type and extent of their disability. The classification system allowed athletes to compete against others with a similar level of function.

The athletics classifications are:

- 11–13: Blind (11) and visually impaired (12, 13) athletes
- 31–38: Athletes with cerebral palsy
- 51–58: Athletes with a spinal cord disability

The class numbers were given prefixes of "T", "F" and "P" for track, field and pentathlon events, respectively.

Visually impaired athletes classified 11 run with full eye shades and a guide runner; those classified 12 have the option of using a guide; those classified 13 did not use a guide runner.

== Events ==
=== T12 ===
The T12 classification marathon was contested by T12 and T11 athletes. Up to two guide runners were allowed to support each competitor.

Rank	Name	Nationality	Time	Notes
1st place, gold medalist(s)	Elena Pautova	Russia	2:58:23	WR
2nd place, silver medalist(s)	Elena Congost	Spain	3:02:50	
3rd place, bronze medalist(s)	Misato Michishita	Japan	3:03:26	
4	Maria Carmen Paredes Rodriguez	Spain	3:07:35	
5	Mihoko Nishijimi	Japan	3:21:02	
6	Yumiko Fujii	Japan	3:22:32	
7	Regina Vollbrecht	Germany	3:26:18	
8	Maria Williams	New Zealand	3:44:00	
9	Naomi Abe	Japan	3:47:36	

=== T54 ===
The T54 classification marathon was contested by T54 and T53 athletes.

Rank	Name	Nationality	Time	Notes
1st place, gold medalist(s)	Tatyana McFadden	United States	1:41:14	
2nd place, silver medalist(s)	Manuela Schär	Switzerland	1:43:56	
3rd place, bronze medalist(s)	Amanda McGrory	United States	1:46:25	
4	Sandra Graf	Switzerland	1:46:27	
5	Susannah Scaroni	United States	1:47:06	
6	Christie Dawes	Australia	1:56:20	
7	Wakako Tsuchida	Japan	1:56:48	
8	Chelsea McClammer	United States	2:02:31	
9	Sarah Piercy	Great Britain	2:20:45	
9	Martyna Snopek	Great Britain	2:26:40	

== See also ==
- List of IPC world records in athletics
