= Natalia Iezlovetska =

Ukrainian Paralympic athlete

Sport
- Country: Ukraine
- Sport: Para-athletics
- Disability class: T20
- Event: 400 metres
Medal record
Summer Paralympics
Silver medal – second place	2016 Rio de Janeiro	400 m T20
World Championships
Silver medal – second place	2015 Doha	400 m T20
European Championships
Bronze medal – third place	2018 Berlin	400 m T20

Natalia Iezlovetska is a Ukrainian Paralympic athlete. She represented Ukraine at the 2016 Summer Paralympics and she won the silver medal in the women's 400 metres T20 event.

She won the silver medal in the women's 400 metres T20 event at the 2015 IPC Athletics World Championships.

She won the bronze medal in the women's 400 metres T20 event at the 2018 World Para Athletics European Championships held in Berlin, Germany.
