= 2015 IPC Athletics World Championships – Women's 800 metres =

The women's 800 metres at the 2015 IPC Athletics World Championships was held at the Suheim Bin Hamad Stadium in Doha from 22–31 October.

== Medalists ==
Event	Gold		Silver		Bronze	
T11	Renata Bazone Teixeira; Guide: Fernando Ribeiro Junior; Brazil	2:24.31 SB	Befilia Buya; Guide: Eduardo Chimboto; Angola	4:34.72	—N/a	
T20	Barbara Niewiedzial; Poland	2:22.09 PB	Mariia Koltcova; Russia	2:24.38 PB	Shirley Kerkhove; Netherlands	2:24.81 PB
T34	Hannah Cockroft; Great Britain	2:07.10 CR	Mel Nicholls; Great Britain	2:09.29	Kare Adenegan; Great Britain	2:09.66
T53	Madison de Rozario; Australia	1:53.86	Zhou Hongzhuan; China	1:53.95	Angela Ballard; Australia	1:54.08
T54	Zou Lihong; China	1:51.13 SB	Liu Wenjun; China	1:51.51 SB	Margriet van den Broek; Netherlands	1:52.99
WR world record | AR area record | CR championship record | GR games record | NR national record | OR Olympic record | PB personal best | SB season best | WL world leading (in a given season)

== See also ==
- List of IPC world records in athletics
