= Athletics at the 2008 Summer Paralympics – Women's 800 metres T12–13 =

The Women's 800m T12-13 had its first round held on September 8, beginning at 18:40 and Final was held on September 9 at 18:35.

== Medalists ==
Gold	Somaya Bousaid; Tunisia
Silver	Assia El'Hannouni; France
Bronze	Elena Pautova; Russia

== Results ==
Place	Athlete	Class	Round 1	Final A
1	Somaya Bousaid (TUN)	T13	2:20.18 Q	2:03.21
2	Assia El'Hannouni (FRA)	T12	2:09.21 Q	2:04.96 WR
3	Elena Pautova (RUS)	T12	2:17.27 q	2:15.70
4	Rima Batalova (RUS)	T12	2:20.59 q	2:20.94
5	Miroslava Sedlackova (CZE)	T11	2:21.54	
6	Elena Congost (ESP)	T12	2:22.74	
7	Odete Fiuza (POR)	T11	2:31.67	
8	Nathalie Nilsson (SWE)	T13	2:32.70	
