= 2015 IPC Athletics World Championships – Women's triple jump =

The women's triple jump at the 2015 IPC Athletics World Championships was held at the Suheim Bin Hamad Stadium in Doha from 22–31 October.

== Medalists ==
Event	Gold		Silver		Bronze	
T20	Mikela Ristoski; Croatia	11.67 WR	Erica Gomes; Portugal	10.89 PB	Ana Filipe; Portugal	10.07
WR world record | AR area record | CR championship record | GR games record | NR national record | OR Olympic record | PB personal best | SB season best | WL world leading (in a given season)

== See also ==
- List of IPC world records in athletics
