= Liudmyla Danylina =

Ukrainian Paralympic athlete (born 1985)

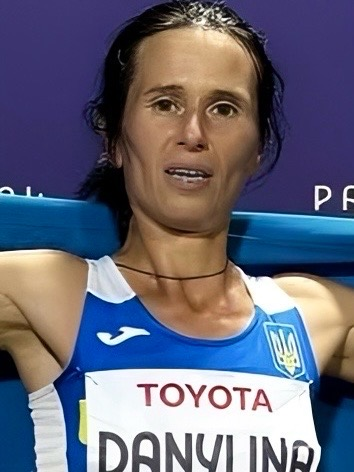
- Danylina at the 2024 Summer Paralympics

Personal information
- Born: 11 September 1985 (age 41)

Sport
- Country: Ukraine
- Sport: Para-athletics
- Disability: Intellectual impairment
- Disability class: T20
- Events: 800 metres; 1500 metres
Medal record
Paralympic Games
Silver medal – second place	2020 Tokyo	1500 metres T20
Silver medal – second place	2024 Paris	1500 metres T20
Bronze medal – third place	2016 Rio de Janeiro	1500 metres T20
World Championships
Silver medal – second place	2017 London	1500 metres T20
Silver medal – second place	2019 Dubai	1500 metres T20
European Championships
Silver medal – second place	2018 Berlin	800 metres T20
Silver medal – second place	2018 Berlin	1500 metres T20

Liudmyla Danylina (born 11 September 1985) is a Ukrainian Paralympic athlete competing in T20-classification middle-distance running events. In 2021, she won the silver medal in the women's 1500 metres T20 event at the 2020 Summer Paralympics in Tokyo, Japan. She also represented Ukraine at the 2016 Summer Paralympics in Rio, Brazil and she won the bronze medal in the women's 1500 metres T20 event.

== Career ==
She won the silver medal in the women's 1500 metres T20 event at the 2017 World Para Athletics Championships held in London, United Kingdom. She also won the silver medal at the women's 1500 metres T20 event at the 2019 World Para Athletics Championships held in Dubai, United Arab Emirates.

At the 2018 World Para Athletics European Championships held in Berlin, Germany, she won the silver medal in the women's 800 metres T20 event and also the silver medal in the women's 1500 metres T20 event.

She qualified to compete in the women's 1500 metres T20 event at the 2020 Summer Paralympics in Tokyo, Japan after winning the silver medal at the 2019 World Para Athletics Championships held in Dubai, United Arab Emirates.

== Achievements ==
Year	Competition	Venue	Position	Event	Notes
Representing Ukraine
2016	Summer Paralympics	Rio de Janeiro, Brazil	3rd	1,500 m	4:28.78
2017	World Championships	London, United Kingdom	2nd	1,500 m	4:35.08
2018	European Championships	Berlin, Germany	2nd	800 m	2:16.83
2018	European Championships	Berlin, Germany	2nd	1,500 m	4:45.37
2019	World Championships	Dubai, United Arab Emirates	2nd	1,500 m	4:40.86
2021	Summer Paralympics	Tokyo, Japan	2nd	1,500 m	4:32.82
