= José Martínez (runner) =

Spanish paralympic athlete (born 1984)

Personal information
- Full name: José Martínez Morote
- Nationality: Spanish
- Born: 5 February 1984 (age 42) Hellín, Albacete, Spain

Sport
- Country: Spain
- Sport: Track and field (T20)

José Martínez Morote (born 5 February 1984 in Hellín, Albacete) is a Paralympic athlete from Spain competing mainly in category T20 track and field events. He has an intellectual disability, attended school in Cruz de Mayo and serves as a mentor to local track and field athletes. While he originally started sport playing football, he switched to athletics by the age of 16 at the suggestion of a teacher who noticed his speed with the ball. He has gone on to compete at the 2007 World Games, the 2011 IPC World Athletics Championships in Christchurch, New Zealand and the 2012 Summer Paralympics. Martínez has held at least two athletics scholarships to continue his participation in the sport.

== Personal ==
Martínez was born on 5 February 1984 in Albacete, Spain, and has an intellectual disability. He continued in 2007 to reside in the city of his birth. He attended school in Cruz de Mayo. and mentors younger athletes where he lives. He has chosen not to date women because it would interfere with his ability to train and compete in athletics at the elite level.

In 2008, Martínez earned a mention by the jury of the Culture and Sport at the annual award ceremony for the Federation of Employers of Albacete (FEDA).

== Athletics ==
Morote started competing in athletics when he was 16 years old. Prior to taking up the sport, he was involved with football but switched to athletics after a teacher suggested his speed with the ball was better suited for athletics. He has competed in international competitions in Tunisia, Hungary, Sweden, Australia, France, Prague, Brazil and China. Locally, he participated in a number of workshops where he was coached by Camilo and Maxi. He is a member of Club Paralímpico de la Región athletic club in Castilla-La Mancha, where he is the only male participant. He has been funded by the 'Castilla-La Mancha Olímpica' program run by the Foundation for Culture and Sports of Castilla-La Mancha. When he was 19 years old, he competed in his first Spanish national championships, where he finished first in the 5,000 and 10,000 meter races.

In 2005, Martínez earned a scholarship for athletics from the Foundation for Culture and Sports of Castilla-La Mancha. Competing at the 2006 Spanish national championships, he earned gold in the 400 and 800 meters. He competed in the 2007 World Games, where he won a silver medal in the 800 meters and a bronze in 1,500 meters.

In 2008, Martínez competed in the Spanish National Athletics Championship where he finished first in the 800 and 1500 meters. That winter, he won the Spanish national winter cross country. The following year at the Spanish National Athletics Championship, he competed in the 400, 800, 1,500, long jump and 4 × 100 meter events, where he repeated his victories from 2008. He competed at the 2008 World Intellectual Disability Indoor Athletics Championships in Tallinn, Estonia in where he finished second in the 400 meter event and third in the 4 × 400 meter event. Competing at the 2008 European Championships, he finished first in the 400 meters. Competing in the 2009 Subida al Castillo de Chiva, he won the one mile Paralympic class with a time of 4:45. He competed in the Czech hosted 2009 World Games. He competed in the 2009 Spanish national cross country championships, where he finished first. The following year, he was unable to defend his title and finished third.

Martínez competed at the 2010 World Indoor Championships for people with intellectual disabilities. Martínez competed in 2010 INAS European Athletics Championship. He competed in the 2011 Subida al Castillo de Chiva one mile race in the Paralympic class.

Competing at the 2011 IPC World Athletics Championships in Christchurch, New Zealand, Martínez finished fourth in the T20 1,500 meter race. Participating at the 2011 World Games, he won silver in 4x100 and competed in the 1,500 meters, and was a member of the gold medal-winning 4 × 400 relay team.

He held another athletics scholarship in 2012, this one from the Spanish-based Fundación Cultura y Deportes and the Spanish business Lafarge. In 2012, he was a recipient of a Plan ADO €2,500 coaching scholarship. He also had a scholarship from the Castilla-La Mancha Olímpica (CLAMO) program run by the regional government. In 2012, he competed in the World Intellectual Disability Indoor Athletics Championships, representing the Federation of Castilla la Mancha, where he won a bronze medal in the 4 × 400 meter event. He finished sixth in the 1,500 meters.

Martínez competed in the 2012 Summer Paralympics in London, England where he finished 8th in the T20 1,500 meter race. He was one of three Spanish athletes competing in London from the Castilla-Mancha region including Francisco Javier Sánchez and Ricardo de Pedraza.
