= 2015 IPC Athletics World Championships – Women's 5000 metres =

The women's 5,000 metres at the 2015 IPC Athletics World Championships was held at the Suheim Bin Hamad Stadium in Doha from 22–31 October.

== Medalists ==
Event	Gold		Silver		Bronze	
T54	Zou Lihong (T54); China	12:10.62	Zhou Hongzhuan (T53); China	12:11.22	Chelsea McClammer (T53); United States	12:11.34
WR world record | AR area record | CR championship record | GR games record | NR national record | OR Olympic record | PB personal best | SB season best | WL world leading (in a given season)

== See also ==
- List of IPC world records in athletics
