= Marianne Verdonk =

Dutch Paralympic athlete

Personal information
- Born: 31 August 1986 (age 39) Eindhoven, Netherlands

Sport
- Country: Netherlands
- Sport: Paralympic athletics
- Disability: Intellectual impairment
- Disability class: T20
- Event(s): 100 metres 200 metres 400 metres 100 metre hurdles 400 metre hurdles Pentathlon; Heptathlon
- Retired: 2016
Medal record
Paralympic athletics
Representing Netherlands
European Championships
Gold medal – first place	2014 Swansea	Women's 400m T20
INAS World Athletics Championships
Gold medal – first place	2005 Canberra	Women's 400m hurdles
Silver medal – second place	2003 Tunis	Women's 100m hurdles
Silver medal – second place	2005 Canberra	Women's 100m hurdles
Silver medal – second place	2009 Jablonec	Women's 100m
Silver medal – second place	2009 Jablonec	Women's 400m hurdles
Silver medal – second place	2013 Výsledky	Women's 100m
Bronze medal – third place	2005 Canberra	Women's 400m
Bronze medal – third place	2007 Fortaleza	Women's 400m hurdles
Bronze medal – third place	2009 Jablonec	Women's 100m hurdles
Bronze medal – third place	2011 Liguria	Women's 100m
Bronze medal – third place	2011 Liguria	Women's 100m hurdles
Bronze medal – third place	2013 Výsledky	Women's 100m hurdles
INAS European Indoor Athletics Championships
Gold medal – first place	2007	Women's 60m hurdles
Silver medal – second place	2007	Women's pentathlon
Bronze medal – third place	2007	Women's 60m
INAS European Outdoor Athletics Championships
Gold medal – first place	2008 Manchester	Women's 100m hurdles
Gold medal – first place	2008 Manchester	Women's 400m hurdles
Silver medal – second place	2006 Dreux	Women's 400m hurdles
Silver medal – second place	2010 Varazdin	Women's 100m
Silver medal – second place	2010 Varazdin	Women's 100m hurdles
Silver medal – second place	2014 Bergen op Zoom	Women's 100m hurdles
Bronze medal – third place	2006 Dreux	Women's 100m hurdles
Bronze medal – third place	2008 Manchester	Women's 100m
Bronze medal – third place	2014 Bergen op Zoom	Women's 100m

Marianne Verdonk (born 31 August 1986) is a retired Dutch Paralympic athlete who competed in mainly sprinting events in international level events.

She retired after not being selected to participate in the 2016 Paralympic Games.
