= Nancy Chelangat Koech =

Kenyan Paralympic athlete

Personal information
- Born: 16 April 1995 (age 31)

Sport
- Country: Kenya
- Sport: Para-athletics
- Disability: Vision impairment
- Disability class: T11
- Events: 200 metres; 1500 metres
Medal record
Paralympic Games
Silver medal – second place	2016 Rio de Janeiro	1500 m T11
Bronze medal – third place	2020 Tokyo	1500 m T11
World Championships
Gold medal – first place	2023 Paris	1500 m T11
Silver medal – second place	2025 New Delhi	1500 m T11
Bronze medal – third place	2019 Dubai	1500 m T11

Nancy Chelangat Koech (born 16 April 1995) is a visually impaired Kenyan para-athlete. She represented Kenya at the 2016 Summer Paralympics in Rio de Janeiro, Brazil, and she won the silver medal in the women's 1500 metres T11 event. She also won the bronze medal in the same event at the 2020 Summer Paralympics in Tokyo, Japan.

== Career ==
At the 2019 World Para Athletics Championships held in Dubai, United Arab Emirates, she won the bronze medal in the women's 1500 metres T11 event.
