= 2013 IPC Athletics World Championships – Women's 1500 metres =

The women's 1,500 metres at the 2013 IPC Athletics World Championships was held at the Stade du Rhône from 20–29 July.

== Medalists ==
Class	Gold	Silver	Bronze
T12	Elena Pautova; Russia	Meryem En-Nourhi; Morocco	Elena Congost Mohedano; Spain
T20	Barbara Niewiedzial; Poland	Arleta Meloch; Poland	Ilona Biacsi; Hungary
T54	Tatyana McFadden; United States	Wakako Tsuchida; Japan; Edith Wolf; Switzerland	No bronze medalist; tie for silver

== See also ==
- List of IPC world records in athletics
