= Louzanne Coetzee =

South African Paralympic athlete

Personal information
- National team: South Africa
- Born: 18 April 1993 (age 33) Bloemfontein, South Africa
- Height: 1.54 m (5 ft 1 in)
- Weight: 48 kg (106 lb)

Sport
- Country: South Africa
- Sport: Para Athletics
- Disability class: T11
- Club: University of the Free State of Bloemfontein
- Coached by: Girda Siebert
Medal record
Paralympic athletics
Representing South Africa
Paralympic Games
Silver medal – second place	2020 Tokyo	1500 m T11
Bronze medal – third place	2020 Tokyo	Marathon T12
Bronze medal – third place	2024 Paris	1500 m T11
World Championships
Silver medal – second place	2023 Paris	1500 m T11
Bronze medal – third place	2024 Kobe	1500 m T11

Louzanne Coetzee (born 18 April 1993) is a South African para-athlete.

== Career ==
Coetzee was born blind as a result of a hereditary condition called Leber congenital amaurosis and competes in the T11 disability class, for athletes with the highest level of visual impairment. In 2017, Coetzee broke the 5000 m (women) world record in her disability class, while in April 2018 she became the first visually impaired athlete to compete at the World University Cross Country Championships in Switzerland.

Coetzee competed at the 2016 Summer Paralympics representing South Africa in the Women's 1500 metres. She was, however, disqualified when her guide, Khotatso Mokone, was deemed to have provided illegal assistance.

In 2021, Coetzee competed at the 2020 Tokyo Paralympics, winning the silver medal in the 1500 m final in a new Africa record of 4:40.96 and the bronze medal in the T12 women's marathon in a new T11 world record time of 3:11:13.
