= Neri Mamani =

Peruvian para athlete (born 1998)

Personal information
- Full name: Neri Roxana Mamani Quispe
- Born: 14 June 1998 (age 28)
- Home town: Cusco, Peru

Sport
- Country: Peru
- Sport: Para-athletics
- Disability class: T11
Medal record
Women's para-athletics
Representing Peru
World Championships
Gold medal – first place	2025 New Delhi	1500 m T11

Neri Roxana Mamani Quispe (born 14 June 1998) is a Peruvian para athlete. She won Peru's first gold medal at the World Para Athletics Championships in 2025.

== Career ==
Mamani represented Peru at the 2024 Summer Paralympics. She competed at the 2025 World Para Athletics Championships and won a gold medal in the 1500 metres T11 event with a time of 4:59.93. This was Peru's first gold medal at the World Para Athletics Championships.
