= Athletics at the 2004 Summer Paralympics – Women's 800 metres T12 =

Women's 800m T12 at the XII Paralympic Games
- Venue: Athens Olympic Stadium
- Dates: 20–22 September 2004
- Competitors: 9 from 7 nations
- Winning time: 2:07.89

Medalists
1st place, gold medalist(s)		Assia El Hannouni	France
2nd place, silver medalist(s)		Rima Batalova	Russia
3rd place, bronze medalist(s)		Elena Pautova	Russia

The Women's 800m race for class T12 visually impaired athletes at the 2004 Summer Paralympics were held in the Athens Olympic Stadium. The event consisted of 2 heats and a final, and was won by Assia El Hannouni, representing France.

== 1st round ==
Qualified for next round

Heat 1

20 Sept. 2004, 09:45

Rank	Athlete	Time	Notes
1	Tracey Hinton (GBR)	2:22.71	Q
2	Rima Batalova (RUS)	2:22.86	q
3	Sandra Barrero (ESP)	2:23.91	
4	Julia Longorkaye (KEN)	2:24.22	
5	Victoria Tchernova (RUS)	2:36.60	

Heat 2

20 Sept. 2004, 09:55

Rank	Athlete	Time	Notes
1	Assia El Hannouni (FRA)	2:17.96	Q
2	Elena Pautova (RUS)	2:18.36	q
3	Pamela McGonigle (USA)	2:19.86	q
4	Terezinha Guilhermina (BRA)	2:24.72	

== Final round ==
22 Sept. 2004, 18:40

Rank	Athlete	Time	Notes
1st place, gold medalist(s)	Assia El Hannouni (FRA)	2:07.89	WR
2nd place, silver medalist(s)	Rima Batalova (RUS)	2:16.56	
3rd place, bronze medalist(s)	Elena Pautova (RUS)	2:16.86	
4	Tracey Hinton (GBR)	2:19.29	
5	Pamela McGonigle (USA)	2:26.38	
