= Erika Keresztesi =

Hungarian Paralympic athlete

Personal information
- Born: 6 September 1987 (age 38) Vác, Hungary

Sport
- Country: Hungary
- Sport: Paralympic athletics
- Disability class: T20
Medal record
Paralympic athletics
Representing Hungary
European Championships
Silver medal – second place	2014 Swansea	400m T20

Erika Keresztesi (born 6 September 1987) is a Hungarian Paralympic athlete who competes in sprinting and middle-distance running events at international track and field competitions. She is a European silver medalist in the 400m T20, she also competed at the 2016 Summer Paralympics where she finished seventh place in the 400m T20.
