= 2015 IPC Athletics World Championships – Women's 4 × 400 metres relay =

The women's 4x400 metres relay at the 2015 IPC Athletics World Championships was held at the Suheim Bin Hamad Stadium in Doha from 22–31 October.

== Medalists ==
Event	Gold		Silver	Bronze
T53-54	Zhou Hongzhuan (T53); Liu Wenjun (T54); Huang Lisha (T53); Zou Lihong (T54); China	3:43.54 CR	—N/a	—N/a
WR world record | AR area record | CR championship record | GR games record | NR national record | OR Olympic record | PB personal best | SB season best | WL world leading (in a given season)

== See also ==
- List of IPC world records in athletics
