= Margriet van den Broek =

Dutch wheelchair racer

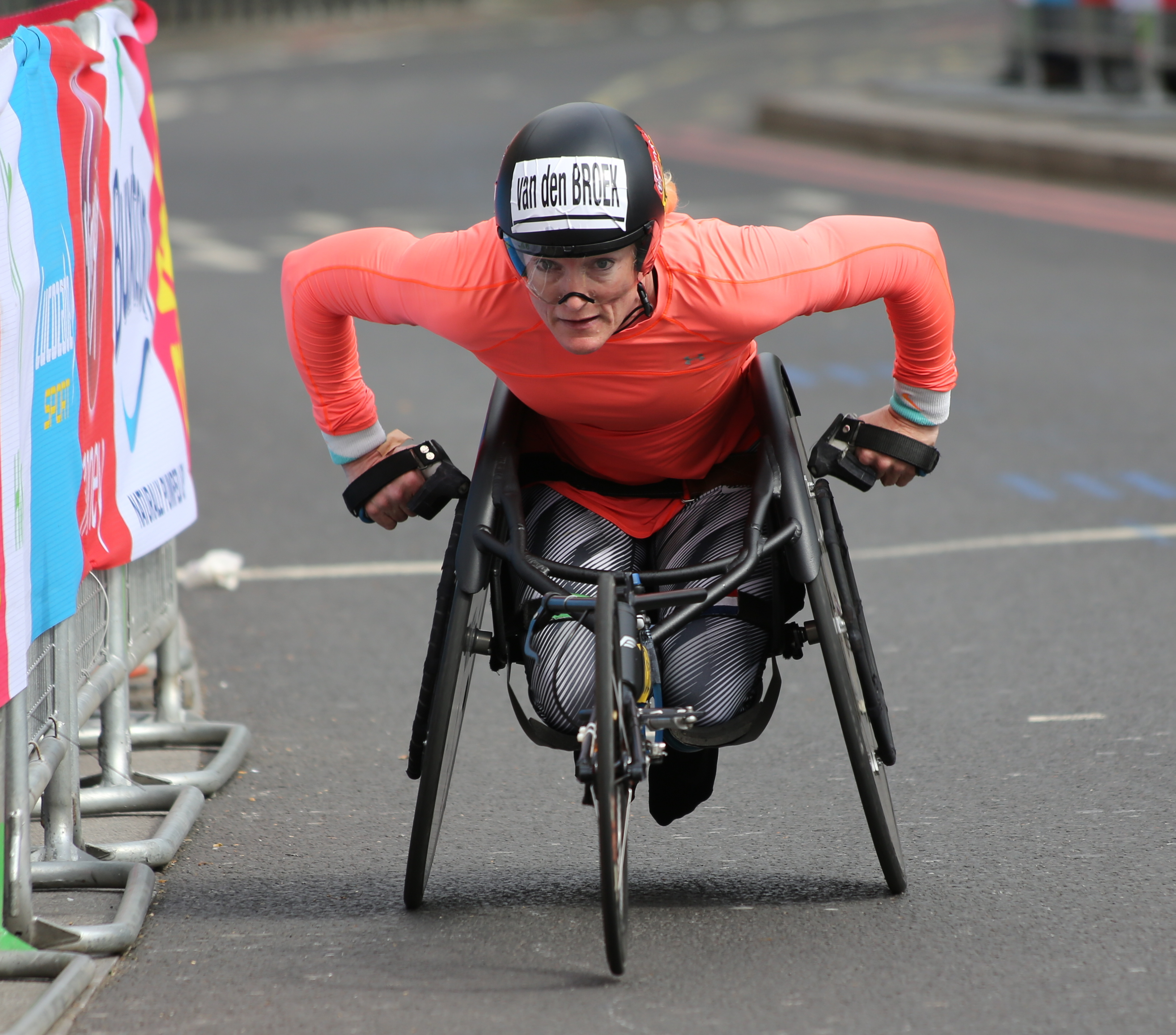
- van den Broek at the 2017 London Marathon

Personal information
- Born: 30 March 1974 (age 52)

Sport
- Country: Netherlands
- Sport: Wheelchair racing
- Events: 100 metres; 400 metres; 800 metres; 1500 metres; 5000 metres
- Coached by: Arno Mul
Medal record
Women's para-athletics
Representing Netherlands
World Championships
| Bronze medal – third place | 2015 Doha | 400 m T54 |
| Bronze medal – third place | 2015 Doha | 800 m T54 |
European Championships
| Gold medal – first place | 2018 Berlin | 800 m T54 |
| Silver medal – second place | 2014 Swansea | 100 m T54 |
| Silver medal – second place | 2018 Berlin | 5000 m T54 |
| Bronze medal – third place | 2018 Berlin | 1500 m T54 |

Margriet van den Broek (born 30 March 1974) is a Dutch wheelchair racer. She won the gold medal in the women's 800 metres T54 event at the 2018 World Para Athletics European Championships held in Berlin, Germany. She also won the silver medal in the women's 5000 metres T54 event and the bronze medal in the women's 1500 metres T54 event.

In 2014, van den Broek won the silver medal in the women's 100 metres T54 event at the 2014 IPC Athletics European Championships held in Swansea, Wales, United Kingdom. In the same year, she also won the silver medal in the women's wheelchair race at the 2014 Berlin Marathon held in Berlin, Germany.

In 2015, she won the bronze medal in both the women's 400 metres T54 and women's 800 metres T54 events at the 2015 IPC Athletics World Championships held in Doha, Qatar.

In 2019, she finished in 4th place in the women's wheelchair race at the 2019 Tokyo Marathon in Tokyo, Japan. In 2020, she finished in 5th place in the women's wheelchair race at the 2020 London Marathon in London, United Kingdom.
