= 2018 World Para Athletics European Championships – Women's 5000 metres =

The women's 5000 metres at the 2018 World Para Athletics European Championships was held at the Friedrich-Ludwig-Jahn-Sportpark in Berlin from 20 to 26 August. 1 event was held over this distance.

== Medalists ==
Event	Gold		Silver		Bronze	
T54	Manuela Schär (SUI)	12:24.47 CR	Margriet van den Broek (NED)	13:21.36	Gunilla Wallengren (SWE)	13:21.88
WR world record | AR area record | CR championship record | GR games record | NR national record | OR Olympic record | PB personal best | SB season best | WL world leading (in a given season)

== See also ==
- List of IPC world records in athletics
