= Öznur Alumur =

Turkish Paralympic athlete

Personal information
- Born: 7 July 1997 (age 28) Gaziantep, Turkey
- Education: Physical education and Sports; Sivas Cumhuriyet University

Sport
- Country: Turkey
- Sport: Paralympic athletics
- Disability: Congenital visual impairment
- Disability class: F11, T11, T12
- Event(s): 400m, 1500m
- Club: Gaziantep BB Disabled SK
- Team: Gaziantep Büyükşehir Belediye Spor
Medal record
Track and field
Representing Turkey
World Para Athletics European Championships
| Silver medal – second place | 2021 Bydgoszcz | 400m T11 |
| Silver medal – second place | 2018 Berlin | 400m T11 |
| Bronze medal – third place | 2018 Berlin | 1500m T11 |
IPC Athletics European Championships
| Bronze medal – third place | 2016 Grosseto | 400m T12 |
| Gold medal – first place | 2016 Grosseto | 1500m T11 |
| Gold medal – first place | 2014 Swansea | 100m T11 |
| Gold medal – first place | 2014 Swansea | 200m T11 |
| Gold medal – first place | 2014 Swansea | 400m T11 |

Öznur Alumur (born 7 July 1997), also known as Öznur Alumur Yılmaz or Öznur Akbulut, is a Turkish female Paralympian athlete competing in the F11, T11 and T12 disability class middle-distance events of 400m and 1500m. She is a member of Gaziantep BB Disabled SK.

== Private life ==
Öznur Alumur was born visually impaired in Gaziantep, southwestern Turkey on 7 July 1997. She completed primary and middle school at GAP School of Visually Impaired. She then graduated from Gaziantep Anatolian High School. She studied at Physical education and Sports at Sivas Cumhuriyet University.

She is married to middle-distance visual-impaired para-athlete Oğuz Akbulut.

== Sport career ==
In 2011, Alumur began with sports., and in 2013, she switched over to para athletics.

She won three gold medal in the 100m T11, 200m T11 and 400m T11 events at the 2014 IPC Athletics European Championships held in Swansea, Wales, United Kingdom.

She took three bronze medals at the 2015 IBSA World Games in Seoul, South Korea.

In 2016, she took the bronze medal in the 400m T12 event, and the gold medal in the 1500m T11 event at the 2016 IPC Athletics European Championships held in Grosseto, Italy.

She took the silver medal n the 400m T11 event and the bronze medal in the 1500m T11 event of the 2018 World Para Athletics European Championships in Berlin, Germany.

In February 2021, she won the gold medal in the 1500m T11 event at the Dubai 12th International Open Athletics Meeting / Grand Prix in The United Arab Emirates. She won the silver medal in the 400m T11 event of the 2021 World Para Athletics European Championships in Bydgoszcz, Poland.
