= Elena Pautova =

Russian Paralympic athlete

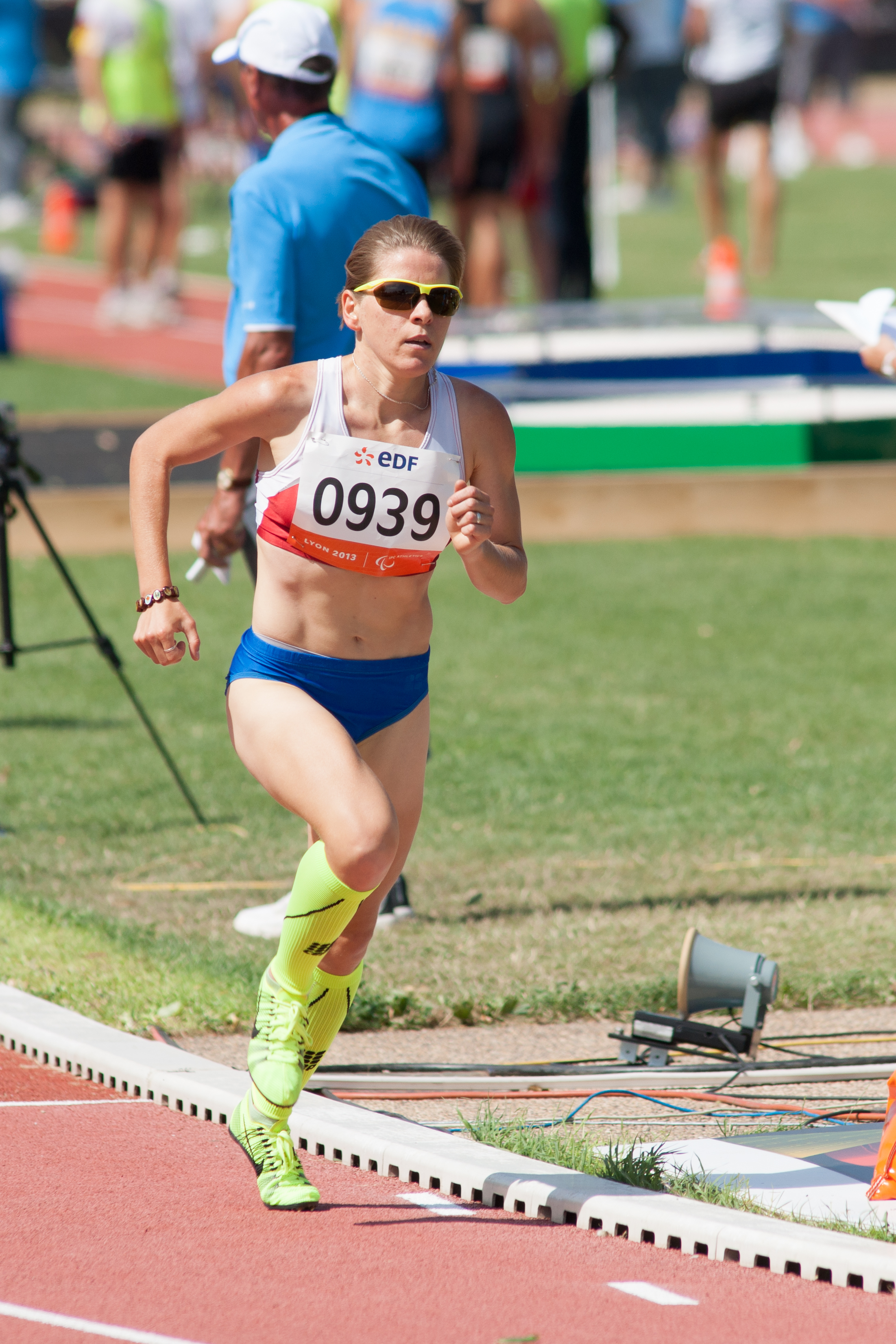
- Pautova at the 2013 IPC Athletics World Championships.

Personal information
- Nationality: Russian
- Born: 22 January 1986 (age 40) Adler, Russia

Sport
- Sport: track and field
- Disability class: T12
- Event(s): 800m 1500m
- Coached by: Pyotr Buylov
Medal record
Event	1st	2nd	3rd
Paralympic Games	2	0	3
World Championships	3	1	2
European Championships	3	0	0
Women's para-athletics
Representing Russia
Paralympic Games
Gold medal – first place	2004 Athens	1500 metres – T12
Gold medal – first place	2012 London	1500 metres – T12
Bronze medal – third place	2004 Athens	800 metres – T12
Bronze medal – third place	2008 Beijing	1500 metres – T13
Bronze medal – third place	2008 Beijing	800 metres – T12/13
World Championships
Gold medal – first place	2006 Assen	1,500m T13
Gold medal – first place	2011 Christchurch	1,500m T13
Gold medal – first place	2013 Lyon	1,500m – T13
Silver medal – second place	2015 Doha	1,500m – T13
Bronze medal – third place	2006 Assen	800m T13
Bronze medal – third place	2019 Dubai	1,500m – T13
European Championships
Gold medal – first place	2012 Stadskanaal	1,500m – T13
Gold medal – first place	2014 Swansea	1,500m – T12
Gold medal – first place	2016 Grosseto	1,500m – T13
Representing Neutral Paralympic Athletes (NPA)
World Championships
Bronze medal – third place	2025 New Delhi	1500 m T13

Elena Pautova (born 22 January 1986) is a Paralympian athlete from Russia competing mainly in category T12 middle-distance events. She is a two times Paralympic gold medalist and three times World Championship gold medalist in the 1500m race. Pautova also broke the world record in the T13 5000m event in 2003.

== Career history ==
Pautova, who is visually impaired, first took to athletics while she attended a specialised boarding school in Armavir, Russia. She began competing competitively whilst still a teenager, and she competed in both middle and long-distance events. At the age of 17 she entered an international meet in Quebec, Canada and ran in a T13 5000m contest. There she posted an officially recognized time of 17:50.45, a new world record. Due to the rarity of official T13 5000m races at major competitions, Pautova's record, as of 2013, still stands. Pautova then switched to middle-distance events, and at the age of 18 she was selected for her first Paralympics, chosen to represent Russia at the 2004 Summer Paralympics in Athens. It was an extremely successful competition for Pautova, winning the gold medal in the T12 1500m and a bronze medal in the T12 800m.

In 2006, she travelled to Assen where she took part in the Athletics World Championships. There she entered her favoured two events the 800, and 1,500m, and finished with an identical result to Athens; a gold in the 1,500m and bronze in the 800m. She returned to the Paralympics in 2008 in Beijing, China, winning two more bronze medals in the T13 1500m and the joint classified T12/13 800m.

In 2011, she retained her World title in the 1,500m, successfully defending it at the 2011 IPC Athletics World Championships in Christchurch, New Zealand. Then in the run-up to the 2012 London Paralympics, she took the gold, again in the 1,500m, at the 2012 European Championships in Stadskanaal. In London she posted a season's best of 4:37.65 to beat her nearest rival, Spain's Elena Congost, by almost seven seconds to take her second Paralympic gold medal. After her triumph in London, Pautova was awarded the Order of Honour, and received her medal form President Vladimir Putin at a ceremony held in the Kremlin.

In 2013 Pautova secured a third World gold title in the 1,500m with a win at the 2013 IPC Athletics World Championships in Lyon, making her the undefeated World champion at that distance for eight years.
