= Annabelle Colman =

Australian Paralympic athlete

Personal information
- Nationality: Australian
- Born: 2 March 2004 (age 22) Switzerland

Sport
- Country: Australia
- Sport: Athletics
- Club: Old Xaverians Athletics Club
Medal record
Women's para-athletics
Representing Australia
World Championships
Bronze medal – third place	2025 New Delhi	1500 m T20

Annabelle Colman (born 2 March 2004) is an Australian Paralympic athletics competitor with an intellectual disability. She competed at the 2024 Paris Paralympics.

== Personal ==
Colman was born on 2 March 2004 in Switzerland. She attended the Rossbourne School in Melbourne, Victoria.

== Athletics ==
She is classified as a T20 athlete. Her athletics journey started over overseas at the age of seven. It became more serious in Melbourne when she joined Inclusive Sports Training with Liz Gosper and then the Old Xaverians Athletics Club with Anthony de Castella at the age of fifteen. She represented Australia at the Virtus Global Games in Brisbane winning Gold in the 800 m and 1500 m events.

At the 2023 World Para Athletics Championships, she finished eighth in the Women's 1500 m T20. Colman is the current Australian record holder for the Women' 1500 m T20, a record previously held by Patricia Flavel. At the 2024 Paris Paralympics, she finished fourth in the Women's 1500 m T20, setting an Oceania record in 4:31.54.

He is coached by Anthony de Castella and Liz Gosper.
