= Zou Lihong =

Chinese Paralympic athlete

Personal information
- Native name: 邹丽红
- Nationality: Chinese
- Born: 26 February 1984 (age 42) Dali, China
- Height: 162 cm (64 in)

Sport
- Country: China
- Sport: Athletics (track)
- Disability: Limb deficiency
- Disability class: T54
- Club: Shanghai
- Coached by: Huang Peng
Medal record
Track and field
Representing China
Paralympic Games
Gold medal – first place	2016 Rio de Janeiro	Marathon T54
Gold medal – first place	2016 Rio de Janeiro	4 × 100 m T53/54
Bronze medal – third place	2012 London	800m T54
World Championships
Gold medal – first place	2015 Doha	800m T54
Gold medal – first place	2015 Doha	5000m T54
Gold medal – first place	2015 Doha	4 × 400 m T53–54
Silver medal – second place	2015 Doha	400m T54
Asian Para Games
Gold medal – first place	2018 Jakarta	1500m T53/54
Bronze medal – third place	2010 Guangzhou	200m T54

Zou Lihong ( Chinese: 邹丽红) born 26 February 1984) is a Paralympic Champion from China competing mainly in category T54 sprint, middle-distance and long-distance events.

== Athletic career ==
Zou made her first senior appearance as a T54 athlete for China in 2010 at track meet in Guangzhou. Her first major international competition was at the 2012 Summer Paralympics in London. She entered four track events winning bronze in the 800 metres middle-distance race. As well as her Paralympic success, Zou has also found success at World Championship level. At the 2015 Doha she medals at all four events she entered, including three golds, in the individual 800 m and 5000m and the 4 × 400 m relay. Zou also enters long-distance events, finishing fifth in the 2016 London Marathon.

== Personal history ==
Zou was born in Dali, China in 1984. During her childhood she contracted polio which resulted in an impairment to her legs.
