= Barbara Bieganowska-Zając =

Polish Paralympic athlete

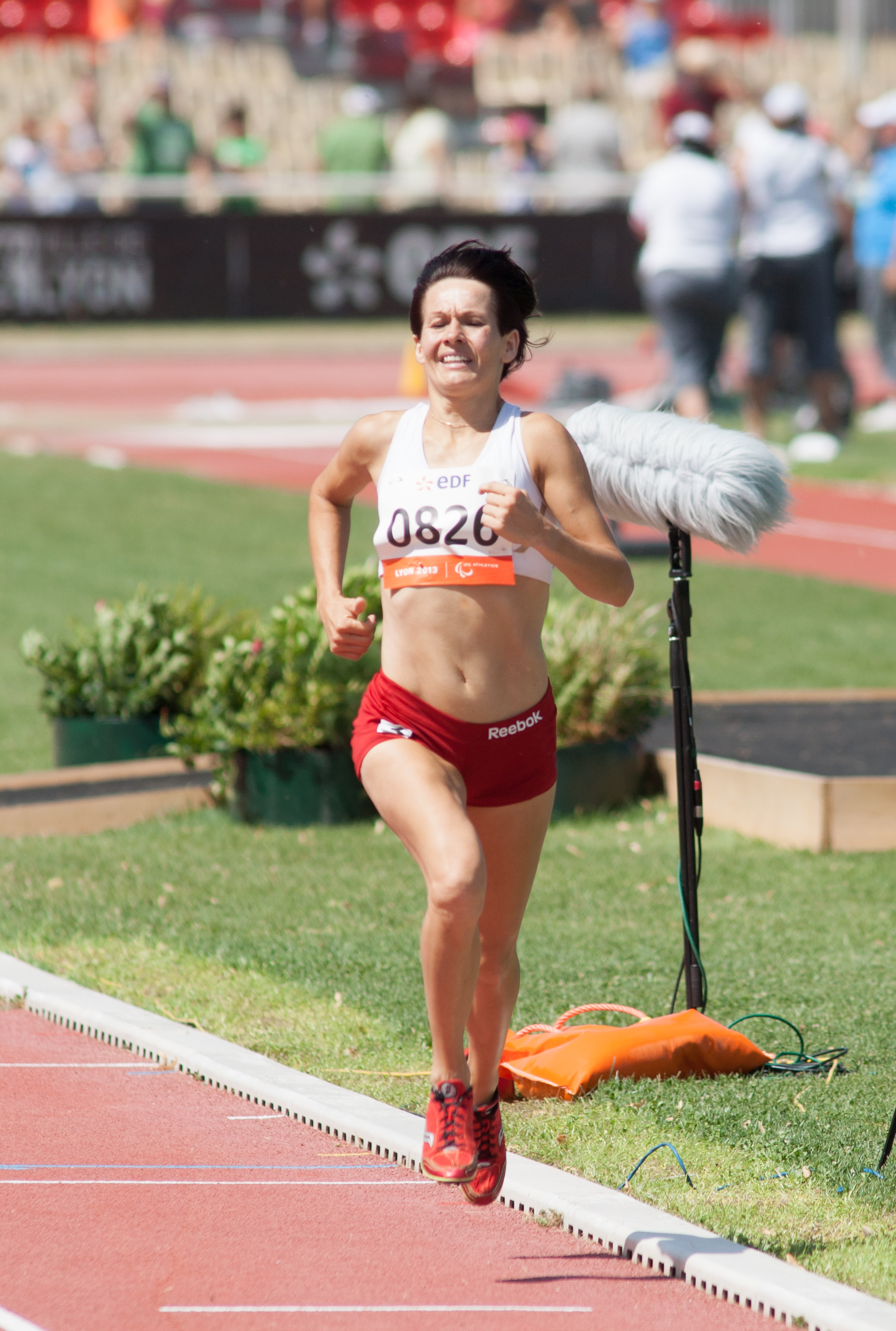
- Niewiedział at the 2013 IPC Athletics World Championships in Lyon.

Personal information
- Nationality: Polish
- Born: 1 September 1981 (age 45) Nysa, Poland

Sport
- Sport: track and field
- Disability: Intellectual impairment
- Disability class: T20
- Events: 400m 800m 1500m
- Club: MGOKSiR Korfantow
- Coached by: Mariusz Zabinski (club); Zbigniew Lewkowicz (national)
Medal record
Event	1st	2nd	3rd
Paralympic Games	5	0	0
World Championships	8	2	0
European Championships	3	0	0
Women's para-athletics
Representing Poland
Paralympic Games
Gold medal – first place	2000 Sydney	800 metres – T20
Gold medal – first place	2012 London	1500 metres – T20
Gold medal – first place	2016 Rio de Janeiro	1500 metres – T20
Gold medal – first place	2020 Tokyo	1500 metres – T20
Gold medal – first place	2024 Paris	1500 metres – T20
World Championships
Gold medal – first place	2013 Lyon	1500m – T20
Gold medal – first place	2015 Doha	400m – T20
Gold medal – first place	2015 Doha	800m – T20
Gold medal – first place	2015 Doha	1500m – T20
Gold medal – first place	2017 London	1500m – T20
Gold medal – first place	2019 Dubai	1500m – T20
Gold medal – first place	2023 Paris	1500m – T20
Gold medal – first place	2024 Kobe	1500m – T20
Silver medal – second place	2011 Christchurch	1500m – T20
Silver medal – second place	2025 New Delhi	1500m – T20
European Championships
Gold medal – first place	2012 Stadskanaal	1,500m – T20
Gold medal – first place	2016 Grosseto	400m – T20
Gold medal – first place	2016 Grosseto	1,500m – T20

Barbara Bieganowska-Zając (née Niewiedział born 1 September 1981) is a Paralympian athlete from Poland competing mainly in category T20 sprint and middle-distance events. She is a two time Paralympic gold medalist in the 800m (2000) and 1,500 metres (2012) races and has won four World Athletic titles.

== Personal history ==
Niewiedział was born Barbara Bieganowska in Nysa, Poland in 1981. She has two daughters.

== Athletics career ==
Niewiedział first came to note as an athlete when in 1999 she set a world record mark of 57.48 in the 400 metres at a meet in Seville. She followed this with a gold medal in the 800 metres at the 2000 Summer Paralympics in Sydney, beating her team-mate and long-time rival Arleta Meloch into second place. After Sydney Niewidzial's career as an athlete was halted due to her classification being suspended by the International Paralympic Committee (IPC) following the cheating scandal at the 2000 Games.

In 2009, the IPC decided to reinstate athletes with intellectual disabilities in readiness for the 2012 Summer Paralympics in London. Niewiedział's return to major international athletics came when she was selected for the Poland team at the 2011 IPC Athletics World Championships in Christchurch. There she competed in the 1,500 metres race, coming second to Meloch. Niewidzial followed this with a gold medal in the 1,500 metres at the 2012 IPC Athletics European Championships in Stadskanaal before winning her second Paralympic gold in the same event in London.

Niewiedział had planned to retire after the London Paralympics, but the experience of competing in front of a cheering capacity crowd that the 2012 Games provided changed her decision. Further success followed at the 2013 IPC Athletics World Championships in Lyon where she took gold in her favoured 1,500m. She furthered this success two years later at the World Championships in Doha, taking three gold medals in the 400m, 800m and the 1,500m races.

In the build up to the 2016 Summer Paralympics, Niewiedział travelled to Italy to take part in the 2016 IPC Athletics European Championships in Grosseto. She won both of her races to take the 400m and 1,500m titles.
