= Mónica Olivia Rodríguez =

Mexican Paralympic athlete

Personal information
- Full name: Mónica Olivia Rodríguez Saavedra
- Nickname: Moni
- Born: 14 June 1989 (age 37) Ciudad Guzmán, Mexico
- Height: 1.53 m (5 ft 0 in)

Sport
- Country: Mexico
- Sport: Paralympic athletics
- Disability: Retinoblastoma
- Disability class: T11
- Events: 800 metres 1500 metres
Medal record
Paralympic athletics
Representing Mexico
Paralympic Games
Gold medal – first place	2020 Tokyo	1500 m T11
Parapan American Games
Gold medal – first place	2019 Lima	1500m T11
Bronze medal – third place	2015 Toronto	1500m T11
World Championships
Gold medal – first place	2019 Dubai	1500m T11

Mónica Olivia Rodríguez Saavedra (Note: In this Spanish name, the first or paternal surname is Rodríguez and the second or maternal family name is Saavedra.) (born 14 June 1989) is a Mexican Paralympic athlete who competes in middle-distance running events at international elite competitions. She is a Parapan American Games and World champion in the 1500 metres.

In 2021, she competed at the 2020 Tokyo Paralympics, winning the gold medal in the 1500 m in a new world record of 4:37.40.
