= Maritza Arango Buitrago =

Colombian Paralympic athlete (born 1978)

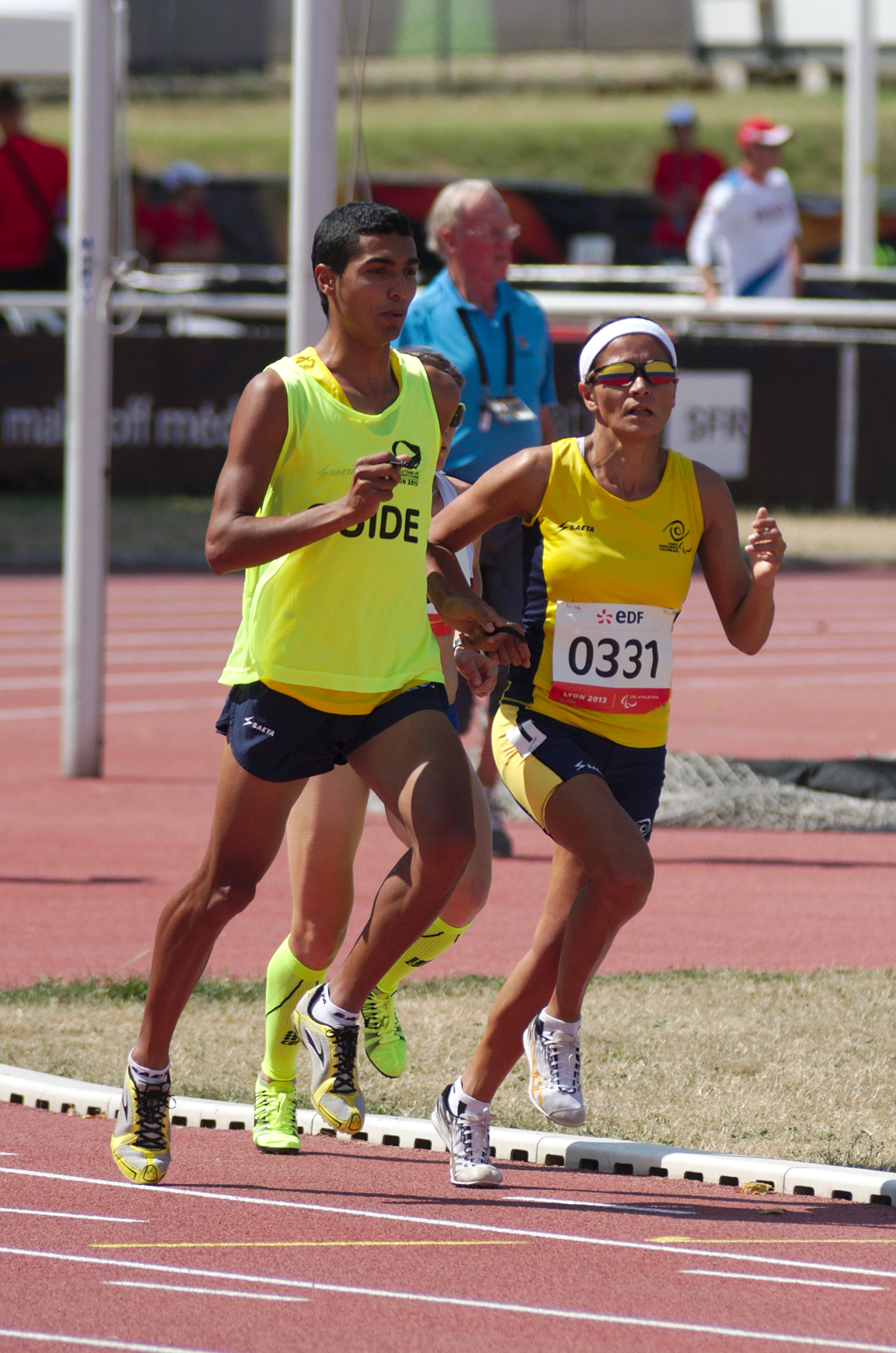
- Maritza Arango Buitrago with her guide Jonathan Sánchez Gonzalez in 2013

Personal information
- Born: 19 March 1978 (age 48) Antioquia, Colombia
- Height: 1.66 m (5 ft 5 1/2 in)
- Weight: 55 kg (121 lb)

Sport
- Country: Colombia
- Sport: Women's athletics
- Disability: Visual impairment
- Disability class: T11
- Events: 400m 800m 1,500m
- Club: Bello Athletics Club

Achievements and titles
- Paralympic finals: 2012
Medal record
Women's athletics
Representing Colombia
Summer Paralympics
Bronze medal – third place	2016 Rio de Janeiro	1500m T11
Bronze medal – third place	2016 Rio de Janeiro	4 × 100 m T11–13
IPC World Championships
Silver medal – second place	2011 Christchurch	800m T11
Silver medal – second place	2013 Lyon	800m T11
Silver medal – second place	2017 London	1500m T11
Parapan American Games
Gold medal – first place	2015 Toronto	1500m T11
Silver medal – second place	2015 Toronto	800m T12
Silver medal – second place	2019 Lima	1500m T11

Maritza Arango Buitrago (born 19 March 1978) is a middle-distance para-sport athlete from Colombia who competes mainly in middle-distance events in the T11 category. She has represented Colombia at the 2012 Summer Paralympics in London and has won silver in the 800m at two consecutive IPC Athletics World Championships. She won two bronze medals at the 2016 Summer Paralympics in Rio de Janeiro.

== Personal history ==
Arango Buitrago was born in the Antioquia district of Colombia in 1978 to Gustavo and Romelia. The third of eight children, she grew up on the outskirts of the city of Santa Marta Antioquia, and was educated at Marco Fidel Suarez School. She became a nursery school teacher and in 1999 she gave birth to a son, Juan. In 2003, she was diagnosed with retinitis pigmentosa a degenerative eye disease. The illness progressed and over the following years she lost her sight. Initially she had depression and spent two years where she did not want to leave her home. She broke her depression when she decided to take control of her disability and learn to live with it. Over the next two years she learnt braille and found work in a factory, packing hospital gloves. In her free time she enjoyed swimming, but a chance meeting with running coach Juan "Chope" Guillermo Rodríguez led her to take up athletics.

== Career history ==
Arango Buitrago first became involved about a year after being approached by Chope. She first tried out running whilst blind at the Estadio Alfonso Galvis Duque and from there she developed a passion for the sport. In 2011, she was selected for the Colombia national team at the IPC Athletics World Championships. She competed in two events, the 400m and 800m races. In the 400m qualifiers she was placed in the last of the three heats. Although she finished second behind Britain's Tracey Hinton, her time of 1:07.94 was the fastest losing time of the heats and she took the fourth space in the finals. In the final, despite running a season's best of 1:05.88, Arango Buitrago finished outside the medals in fourth place. In the 800m qualifiers she posted a time of 2:31.31 in the second heat to go through in first place setting an area record. She ran a slower time in the final, but it was still enough for her to finish second behind the Czech Republic's Miroslava Sedlackova to collect the silver medal.

In 2012 Arango Buitrago, was selected to represent Colombia at the 2012 Summer Paralympics in London. Unfortunately for her, her favoured 400m and 800m T11 events were not part of that year's schedule and she elected to run in the 1500m T12 event. Running with her guide Jonathan Sánchez Gonzalez, she finished sixth in a time of 5:05.72.

The next year Arango Buitrago represented Colombia again, this time at the 2013 IPC Athletics World Championships held in Lyon, France. She entered two events, the T11 800m and the T12 1,500m, again guided by Jonathan Sánchez Gonzalez. In the 1,500m she was placed in the first semi-final with three T12 athletes, none of her competitors running with guides. She finished in second place with a season's best time of 5:09.81 and automatically qualified for the final. The only T11 athlete in the final, she finished fourth with a time of 5:07.47, the fastest runner with a guide. The 800m, running in a category T11 race where all the athletes were guided, she finished first in her heat with a time of 2:31.03. In the final Arango Buitrago ran 2:24.85 an area record to finish second behind Italy's Annalisa Minetti to take her second World Championship silver medal.
