= Arleta Meloch =

Polish Paralympic athlete

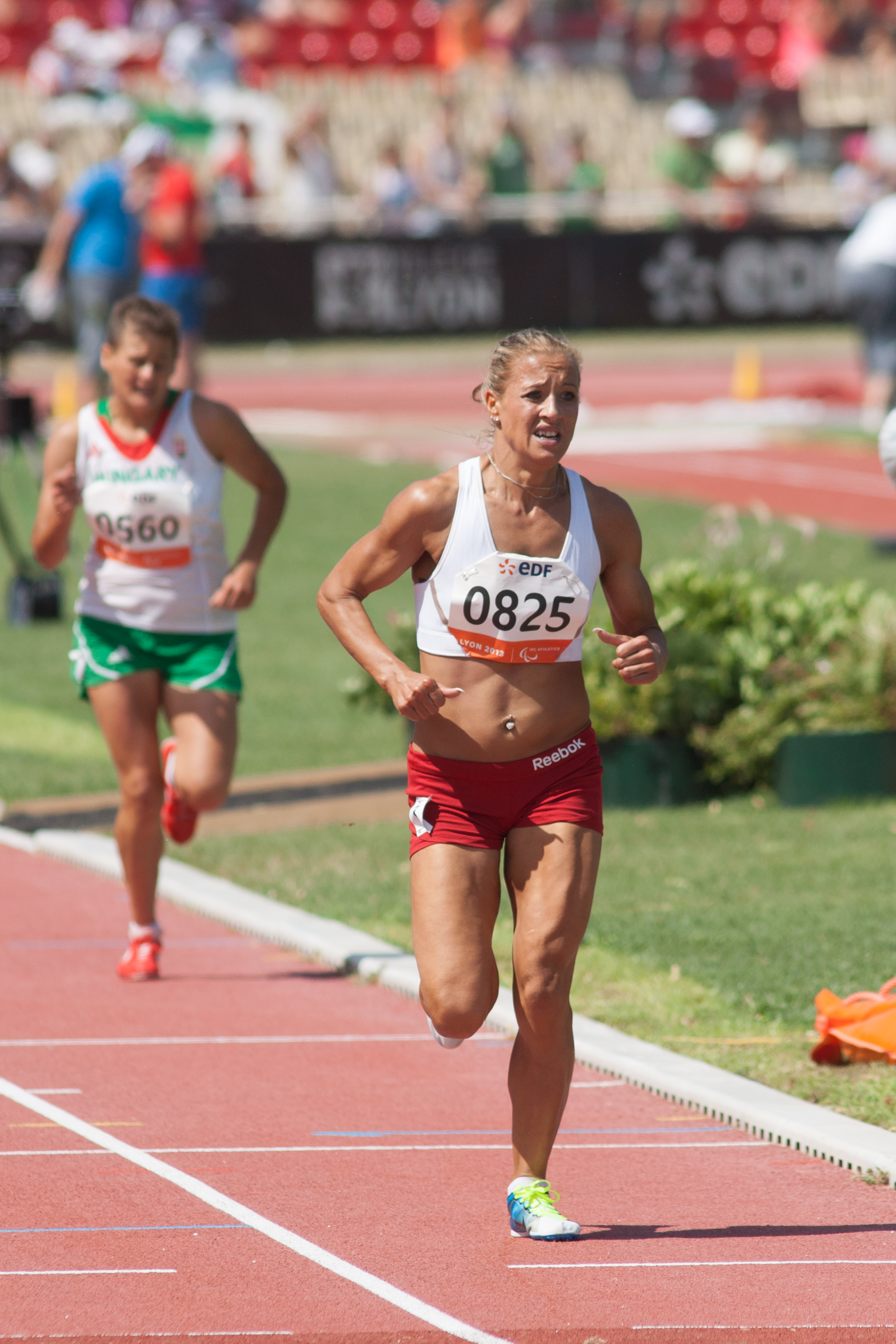
- Arleta Meloch at the 2013 IPC Athletics World Championships.

Personal information
- Nationality: Polish
- Born: 17 August 1979 (age 46) Świecie, Poland

Sport
- Sport: track and field
- Disability class: T20
- Event(s): 800m 1500m 3000m
- Club: GKS Olimpia Grudziądz
- Coached by: Zbigniew Schubring
Medal record
Event	1st	2nd	3rd
Paralympic Games	0	2	0
World Championships	1	3	1
European Championships	1	1	1
Paralympic athletics
Representing Poland
Paralympic Games
Silver medal – second place	2000 Sydney	800 metres – T20
Silver medal – second place	2012 London	1500 metres – T20
IPC World Championships
Gold medal – first place	2011 Christchurch	1,500m T20
Silver medal – second place	1998 Birmingham	3,000m T20
Silver medal – second place	2013 Lyon	1,500m – T20
Silver medal – second place	2015 Doha	1,500m – T20
Bronze medal – third place	1998 Birmingham	800m T20
IPC Athletics European Championships
Gold medal – first place	2016 Grosseto	800m – T20
Silver medal – second place	2012 Stadskanaal	1,500m – T20
Bronze medal – third place	2016 Grosseto	1,500m – T20

Arleta Meloch (born 17 August 1979) is a Paralympian athlete from Poland competing mainly in category T20 middle-distance events. She is a two times Paralympic silver medalist and in 2011 at Christchurch she became the World Champion in the 1500m.
