= Zheng Jin =

Chinese Paralympic athlete

Jin Zheng
Personal information
- Born: June 4, 1991 (age 35)

Sport
- Country: China
- Sport: Para-athletics
- Disability: Vision impairment
- Disability class: T11
- Event: 1500 metres
Medal record
Paralympic Games
Gold medal – first place	2016 Rio de Janeiro	1500m T11
World Championships
Gold medal – first place	2015 Doha	1500m T11
Silver medal – second place	2011 Christchurch	1500m T11
Bronze medal – third place	2017 London	1500m T11
Asian Para Games
Bronze medal – third place	2010 Guangzhou	400m T13

Zheng Jin (born 4 June 1991) is a visually impaired Chinese Paralympic athlete. She represented China at the 2016 Summer Paralympics held in Rio de Janeiro, Brazil and she won the gold medal in the women's 1500 metres T11 event.
