= Rima Batalova =

Russian athlete (born 1964)

Rima Batalova MP
- Рима Баталова
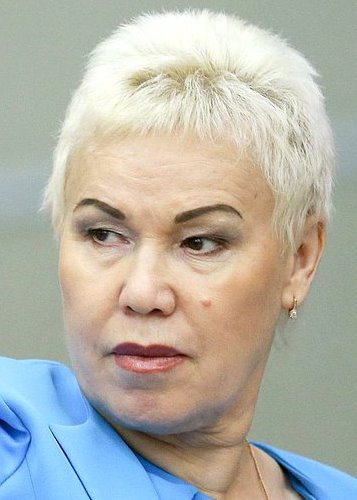
- Batalova in 2018

Member of the State Duma (Party List Seat)
- Incumbent
- Assumed office 21 December 2011

Personal details
- Born: 1 January 1964 (age 62) Sakty, Bashkir ASSR, Russian SFSR, USSR
- Party: United Russia
- Children: 1 daughter
- Education: Ural State Academy of Physical Culture
- Sports career
Medal record
Paralympic athletics
Paralympic Games
Representing Soviet Union
Gold medal – first place	1988 Seoul	400 metres - B2
Gold medal – first place	1988 Seoul	800 metres - B2
Bronze medal – third place	1988 Seoul	100 metres - B2
Representing Unified Team
Gold medal – first place	1992 Barcelona	200 metres - B2
Gold medal – first place	1992 Barcelona	400 metres - B2
Gold medal – first place	1992 Barcelona	800 metres - B2
Gold medal – first place	1992 Barcelona	1500 metres - B2
Silver medal – second place	1992 Barcelona	100 metres - B2
Representing Russia
Gold medal – first place	1996 Atlanta	400 metres - T11
Gold medal – first place	1996 Atlanta	800 metres - T10-11
Gold medal – first place	1996 Atlanta	1500 metres - T10-11
Gold medal – first place	1996 Atlanta	3000 metres - T10-11
Gold medal – first place	2000 Sydney	800 metres - T12
Gold medal – first place	2000 Sydney	1500 metres - T12
Gold medal – first place	2000 Sydney	5000 metres - T12
Silver medal – second place	2004 Athens	800 metres - T12
Bronze medal – third place	2004 Athens	1500 metres - T12

Rima Akberdinovna Batalova (Russian: Рима Акбердиновна Баталова, born 1 January 1964) is a Russian politician. She was formerly a Paralympian athlete competing mainly in category T12 middle-distance events. Since 2011, she has been a member of the State Duma on the United Russia party list.

== Biography ==
Batalova has competed in six Paralympics, she first competed as part of the Soviet Union team in the 1988 Summer Paralympics where she won golds in the 1500m and 200m and a bronze in the 300m. In barcelona in 1992 competing as part of the Unified team she won a further four gold medals in the 200m, 400m, 800m and 1500m as well as silver in the 100m and finishing outside the medals in the 300m. In her next two in 1996 and 2000 she was undefeated, winning 7 gold medals in total including defending her 800m and 1500m titles. In 2004 and 2008 she only competed in the 800m and 1500m but was unable to achieve the same glory with just a silver and bronze in 2004 and nothing in 2008 bringing her tally to 13 gold, 2 silver and 2 bronze.

She was elected to the State Duma in 2016. In 2021, Alexander Sidyakin lost his deputy mandate to Batalova.

Legislative activity

From 2016 to 2021, during her term as a deputy of the State Duma of the 7th convocation, she co-authored 152 legislative initiatives and amendments to draft federal laws.

On 14 November 2023, during the plenary session on the draft law “On a Fair Price” No. 374521-8 (concerning the indication of price per 1 kg of goods), she initiated the refusal of the United Russia faction to vote on the issue, shouting “We are not voting” (timestamp 03:02:49 in the session recording) and leaving the hall, as a result of which the bill was not adopted due to lack of a quorum.

=== Sanctions ===
Batalova was sanctioned by the UK government in 2022 in relation to the Russo-Ukrainian War.

She is one of the members of the State Duma the United States Treasury sanctioned on 24 March 2022 in response to the 2022 Russian invasion of Ukraine.

=== Family ===
Married, has a daughter and two granddaughters.
