= Hannah Taunton =

British Paralympic athlete

Personal information
- Nationality: British
- Born: 31 May 1991 (age 35) Taunton, United Kingdom

Sport
- Country: Great Britain
- Sport: Athletics
- Event: Women's 1500 metres T20
- Club: Taunton Athletics Club
- Coached by: Charlotte Fisher
Medal record
Women's para-athletics
Representing Great Britain
Paralympic Games
Bronze medal – third place	2020 Tokyo	1500 m T20

Hannah Taunton (born 31 May 1991) is a British Paralympic athlete who competes in athletics, in the T20 classification.

== Career ==
Hannah’s first major competition was the 2019 World Para Athletics Championships. She competed in the 1500m T20, placing 5th.

Hannah was selected to compete for Great Britain at the 2020 Summer Paralympics. She won bronze in the Women's 1500 metres T20.

At the 2023 World Para Athletics Championships she came 4th in the T20 1500m.

At the 2024 Summer Paralympics, she came 5th in the T20 1500m.
