= Joanna Mazur =

Polish Paralympic athlete (born 1990)

Personal information
- Nickname: Asia
- Born: 13 March 1990 (age 36) Szczucin, Poland
- Height: 1.67 m (5 ft 6 in)

Sport
- Country: Poland
- Sport: Paralympic athletics
- Disability: Visual impairment
- Disability class: T11
- Events: 100 metres 200 metres 400 metres 800 metres 1500 metres
- Club: START Tarnow
- Coached by: Michał Stawicki (guide runner); Zbigniew Lewkowicz
Medal record
Women's para athletics
Representing Poland
World Championships
| Gold medal – first place | 2017 London | 1500m T11 |
| Silver medal – second place | 2017 London | 800m T11 |
| Bronze medal – third place | 2017 London | 400m T11 |
| Bronze medal – third place | 2025 New Delhi | 1500m T11 |
European Championships
| Gold medal – first place | 2016 Grosseto | 200m T11 |
| Gold medal – first place | 2018 Berlin | 400m T11 |
| Gold medal – first place | 2018 Berlin | 1500m T11 |
| Silver medal – second place | 2016 Grosseto | 100m T11 |
| Silver medal – second place | 2018 Berlin | 200m T11 |
| Bronze medal – third place | 2018 Berlin | 100m T11 |

Joanna Mazur (born 13 March 1990) is a blind Polish Paralympic athlete who competes in sprinting events in international level events. She has been blind since she was seven years old due to a rare genetic defect.

Mazur was a contestant on Dancing with the Stars: Taniec z gwiazdami in 2019.
