= Bernadett Biacsi =

Hungarian Paralympic athlete

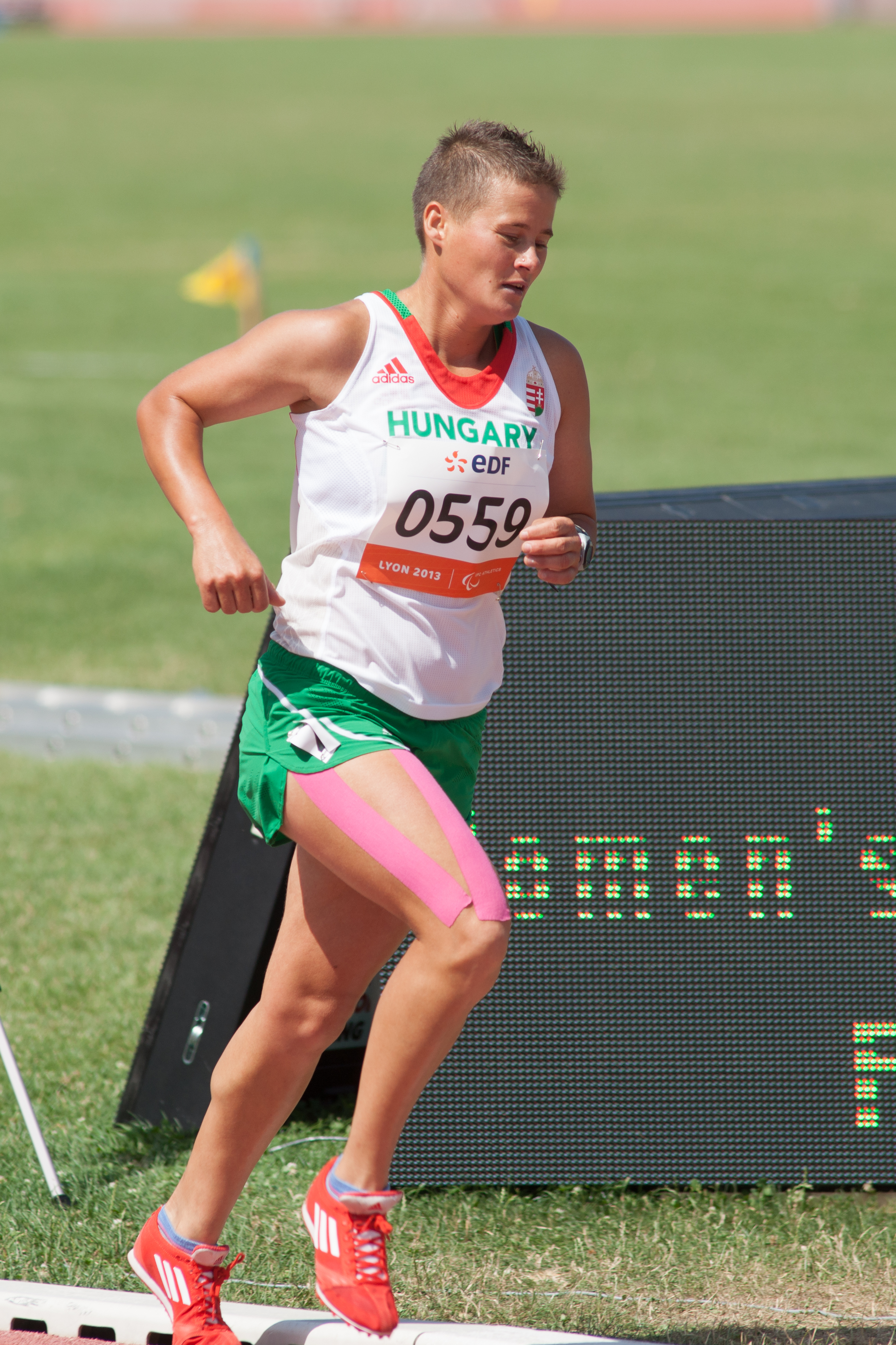
- Biacsi in 2013

Personal information
- Nationality: Hungarian
- Born: 29 December 1985 (age 40) Szeged, Hungary

Sport
- Sport: track and field
- Disability class: T20
- Event(s): 800m 1500m 3000m
- Club: Szegedi VSE
- Coached by: Zemen János

Achievements and titles
- Paralympic finals: 2012 London
Medal record
Paralympic athletics
Representing Hungary
IPC World Championships
Gold medal – first place	2017 London	1,500m - T20
IPC Athletics European Championships
Silver medal – second place	2014 Swansea	1,500m - T20
Silver medal – second place	2016 Grosseto	800m - T20

Bernadett Biacsi (born 29 December 1985) is a Hungarian Paralympic athlete competing mainly in category T20 middle-distance events. Biacsi competed at the 2012 Summer Paralympics in London, finishing fourth in the 1,500m race in her classification. Biacsi won the silver medal at the European Championship in the 1,500 metres in 2014. She followed this with a second silver in the 800m, two years later at the 2016 European Championships in Grosseto. Biacsi's twin sister, Ilona is also a T20 middle-distance athlete and the two were chosen to be joint flag bearers at the opening ceremony of the 2012 Paralympics.
