= Odete Fiúza =

Portuguese Paralympic athlete

Personal information
- Full name: Maria Odete Ferreira Fiúza
- Born: 19 December 1972 (age 53) Leiria, Portugal

Sport
- Country: Portugal
- Sport: Paralympic athletics
- Disability: Amblyopia
- Disability class: T11
- Event(s): 1500 metres Marathon
Medal record
Paralympic athletics
Representing Portugal
European Championships
Silver medal – second place	2014 Swansea	1500m T12
Silver medal – second place	2016 Grosseto	1500m T11
Silver medal – second place	2018 Berlin	1500m T11

Maria Odete Ferreira Fiúza (born 19 December 1972) is a Portuguese Paralympic athlete who competes in international elite events. She specialises in the marathon. She has competed at six Paralympic Games from 2000 to 2020 Summer Paralympics.

She competed at the 2002 IPC Athletics World Championships, 2007 IBSA World Games, winning a silver medal in the 5000 meters and bronze medal in the 1500 meters, and 2011 IBSA World Games.

She was a member of the European Paralympic Committee.
