= Ilona Biacsi =

Hungarian Paralympic athlete

Personal information
- Nationality: Hungarian
- Born: 29 December 1985 (age 40) Szeged, Hungary

Sport
- Sport: Track and field
- Disability class: T20
- Events: 800m 1500m 3000m
- Club: Szegedi VSE
- Coached by: János Zemen
Medal record
Paralympic athletics
Representing Hungary
Paralympic Games
Silver medal – second place	2016 Rio de Janeiro	1500 metres T20
Bronze medal – third place	2012 London	1500 metres T20
World Championships
Bronze medal – third place	2013 Lyon	1,500m T20
Bronze medal – third place	2017 London	1500m T20
Bronze medal – third place	2024 Kobe	1500m T20
European Championships
Gold medal – first place	2014 Swansea	1500m T20
Silver medal – second place	2016 Grosseto	1500m T20
Bronze medal – third place	2014 Swansea	400m T20

Ilona Biacsi (born 29 December 1985) is a Hungarian Paralympic athlete competing mainly in category T20 middle-distance events.

== Career ==
Biacsi competed at the 2012 Summer Paralympics in London, winning a bronze medal in the women's 1,500m race in her classification. She also won the European Championship title in the 1,500 metres in 2014 in Swansea. Biacsi's twin sister, Bernadett is also a T20 middle-distance athlete and the two were chosen to be joint flag bearers for Hungary at the opening ceremony of the 2012 Summer Paralympics.
