= 2015 IPC Athletics World Championships =

Paralympic track and field event

- Host city: Doha, Qatar
- Events: 210
- Dates: 21 – 31 October
- Main venue: Suhaim Bin Hamad Stadium

The 2015 IPC Athletics World Championships were a Paralympic track and field meet organized by the World Para Athletics subcommittee of the International Paralympic Committee. The event was the 7th edition of what is now known as the World Para Athletics Championships, held from 21 to 31 October 2015 at the Suheim Bin Hamad Stadium in Doha, Qatar. It featured 119 men's events and 91 women's events. The Marathon events which are traditionally part of the world championships were separated from the competition and instead held on 26 April as part of the London Marathon.

== Venues ==
In January 2013 the IPC announced that Doha would hold the 2015 athletics world championships. In March 2014 the Suhaim Bin Hamad Stadium, a 15,000-seat venue with an eight-lane track, was confirmed as the host of the event which would take place between 19 and 28 November. However the championships were moved forward by a month to 22 October to avoid construction work around the city. In October 2014 it was decided that the Marathon events would be held separately. The marathon was staged on 26 April at the 2015 London Marathon.

== Coverage ==
The International Paralympic Committee provided live video coverage of over 70 hours of events on its website, as well as live coverage, videos of events and interviews on its ParalympicSportTV channel on YouTube.

In the United Kingdom, Channel 4's sister channel More4 aired live coverage daily throughout the Championship.

Coverage in Germany was streamed live on www.deutsche-paralympische-mannschaft.de with further availability on the German Olympic Sports Confederation (DOSB) sports channel.

== Format ==
The qualification period for the championships lasted from 1 January 2014 to 31 August 2015 with a maximum of three athletes from each nation qualifying for each individual event. Each athlete was required to meet at least the B qualification standards in one IPC approved event. Athletes were required to enter at least one individual event to be able to participate in relays. However, in events where classes are combined each nation may send a maximum of five qualifying athletes.

The marathon events were held separately, taking place on 26 April, the reason given was that the London Marathon would give a better schedule for the athletes. The qualifying period for the marathon events were run between 1 January 2014 to 9 February 2015. All athletes were required to meet the minimum qualifying time to be able to participate having achieved the time at an IPC approved event. Up to six athletes from one country were allowed to compete in each class for the marathon. A maximum of two guide runners per an athlete were allowed for the T11 and 12 classes.

=== Schedule ===
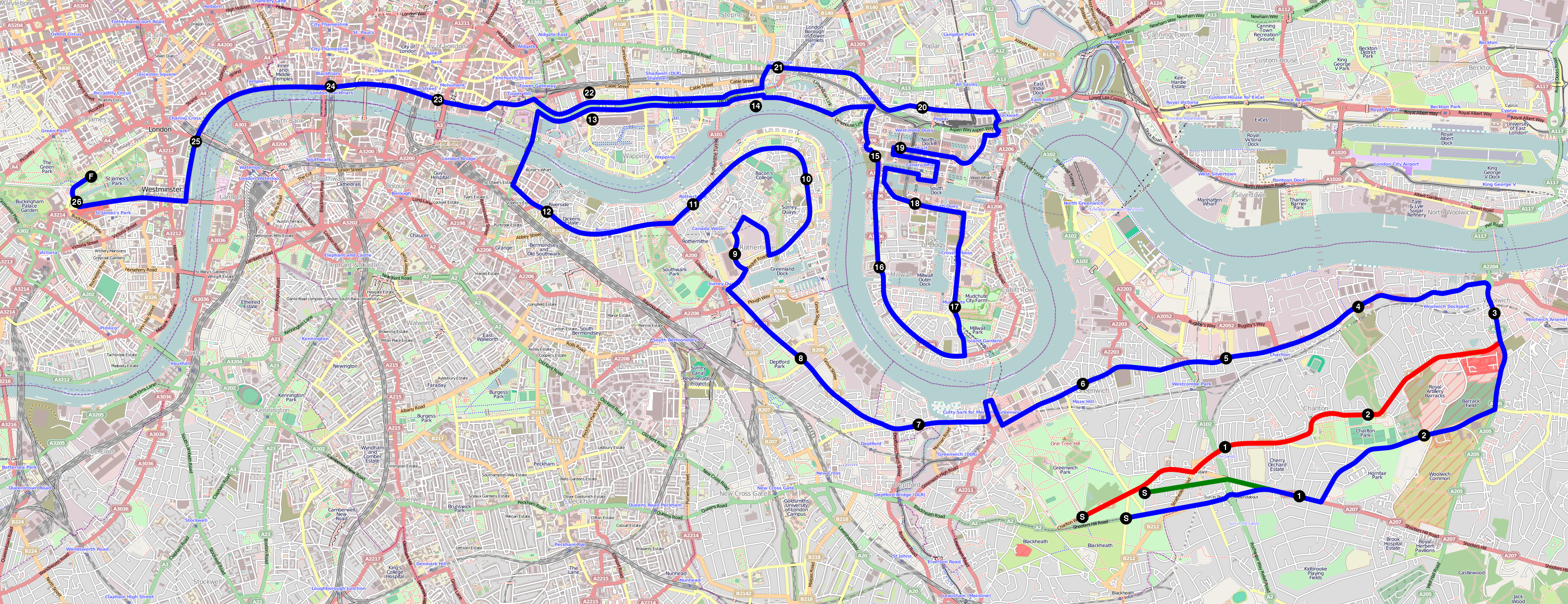
The marathon was run over the London Marathon course, starting from the blue start.

The marathon events for both women and men took part outside the main championship in Doha and were contested as part of the 2015 London Marathon. Unlike the previous Championship in Lyon, no events were contested across disability classifications, whereby results would be giving a points weighting to determine a winning athlete. Many events are open to athletes with lower classification numbers, who are deemed to have a greater impairment, such as the men's discus F56, which can also be contested by F54 and F55 classification athletes.

●	Opening ceremony	Events	●	Closing ceremony

		April	October										
Date →		26	21	22	23	24	25	26	27	28	29	30	31
100 m	Men; Details			T53	T11; T12	T13	T42; T54		T51; T52; T47	T33; T34	T35; T36; T44		T37; T38
100 m	Women; Details			T34; T37; T38		T53; T54		T52	T36	T11; T12	T13; T35; T44	T47; T42	
200 m	Men; Details			T54; T37; T38			T53; T44; T35; T47	T13		T42	T11; T12		T36; T34
200 m	Women; Details			T53; T54	T52	T44; T35	T11; T36; T12		T13	T47	T37; T38		
400 m	Men; Details				T20	T34		T11; T12	T54; T44; T53	T13	T37; T38		T51; T52
400 m	Women; Details				T11; T12	T13	T37; T38; T53	T47	T54	T44		T20	T52; T34
800 m	Men; Details				T13	T38		T36; T34		T20	T54; T53		
800 m	Women; Details							T54	T53	T34; T20		T11	
1500 m	Men; Details			T46		T54	T20	T13; T52				T11; T37; T38	
1500 m	Women; Details					T54; T20		T11				T13	
5000 m	Men; Details							T54; T11			T13	T20	
5000 m	Women; Details										T54		T20
Marathon	Men; Details	T12; T13; T46; T52; T54											
Marathon	Women; Details	T12; T54											
4 × 100 m relay	Men; Details												T11-13; T42-47
4 × 100 m relay	Women; Details												T11-13; T42-47
4 × 400 m relay	Men; Details												T53/54
4 × 400 m relay	Women; Details												T53/54
Long jump	Men; Details			T13	T44	T20; T12	T38	T42	T11; T36	T47	T37		
Long jump	Women; Details			T42; T44	T47		T20		T38	T37	T11; T12		
Triple jump	Men; Details							T47				T20	
Triple jump	Women; Details											T20	
High jump	Men; Details			T42			T12				T47	T44	
Shot put	Men; Details			F42; F36; F12; F20		F32; F41	F35; F38; F33; F37	F34	F44; F57		F46; F53	F40	F55
Shot put	Women; Details			F34	F37; F57; F20		F55; F54	F41	F53; F35; F40	F33; F44	F36	F32	F12
Discus throw	Men; Details			F56; F44		F46	F52		F11	F42		F57; F37	F34; F12
Discus throw	Women; Details				F41	F11	F44	F38	F57; F52	F55	F12		
Javelin throw	Men; Details			F34	F37	F57	F54; F11	F13; F55	F46	F38; F41		F44	
Javelin throw	Women; Details			F11	F54				F13		F34; F56; F37		F46
Club throw	Men; Details							F32			F51		
Club throw	Women; Details			F32		F51							
Ceremonies			●										●

- Records Brokens

== Medal table ==
The medal table at the end of the competition saw China at its head in both total medal count and gold medals won. The host nation Qatar failed to achieve a medal.

Rank	Nation	Gold	Silver	Bronze	Total
1	China (CHN)	41	26	18	85
2	Russia (RUS)	24	21	24	69
3	United States (USA)	13	16	10	39
4	Great Britain (GBR)	13	9	9	31
5	Tunisia (TUN)	11	3	1	15
6	Poland (POL)	9	5	7	21
7	Brazil (BRA)	8	14	13	35
8	Germany (GER)	8	7	9	24
9	Australia (AUS)	8	4	10	22
10	Cuba (CUB)	7	2	0	9
11	Belgium (BEL)	5	0	0	5
12	Ukraine (UKR)	4	8	14	26
13	South Africa (RSA)	4	8	5	17
14	Iran (IRI)	4	7	2	13
15	Canada (CAN)	4	4	3	11
16	France (FRA)	3	5	5	13
17	Netherlands (NED)	3	4	8	15
18	Japan (JPN)	3	2	4	9
19	Greece (GRE)	3	2	3	8
20	Bulgaria (BUL)	3	1	3	7
20	Ireland (IRL)	3	1	3	7
22	Algeria (ALG)	2	7	2	11
23	Thailand (THA)	2	3	4	9
24	Azerbaijan (AZE)	2	2	2	6
25	Croatia (CRO)	2	2	1	5
26	Portugal (POR)	2	1	2	5
27	Italy (ITA)	2	1	1	4
28	Morocco (MAR)	2	0	5	7
29	Malaysia (MAS)	2	0	3	5
30	Spain (ESP)	1	5	4	10
31	Finland (FIN)	1	4	3	8
32	Colombia (COL)	1	3	2	6
33	Mexico (MEX)	1	3	1	5
34	Serbia (SRB)	1	2	2	5
35	Latvia (LAT)	1	2	0	3
36	Namibia (NAM)	1	1	2	4
36	Uzbekistan (UZB)	1	1	2	4
38	Chile (CHI)	1	1	1	3
38	Sweden (SWE)	1	1	1	3
40	Belarus (BLR)	1	1	0	2
40	Iraq (IRQ)	1	1	0	2
42	Cape Verde (CPV)	1	0	0	1
42	Kuwait (KUW)	1	0	0	1
42	Nigeria (NGR)	1	0	0	1
42	Slovakia (SVK)	1	0	0	1
46	United Arab Emirates (UAE)	0	3	1	4
47	Switzerland (SUI)	0	2	3	5
48	Denmark (DEN)	0	2	2	4
48	New Zealand (NZL)	0	2	2	4
50	India (IND)	0	2	0	2
50	Lithuania (LTU)	0	2	0	2
52	Argentina (ARG)	0	1	1	2
52	Turkey (TUR)	0	1	1	2
54	Angola (ANG)	0	1	0	1
54	Austria (AUT)	0	1	0	1
54	Egypt (EGY)	0	1	0	1
54	Jamaica (JAM)	0	1	0	1
54	Syria (SYR)	0	1	0	1
54	Venezuela (VEN)	0	1	0	1
60	Czech Republic (CZE)	0	0	3	3
61	Bermuda (BER)	0	0	1	1
61	Iceland (ISL)	0	0	1	1
61	Indonesia (INA)	0	0	1	1
61	Mozambique (MOZ)	0	0	1	1
61	Vietnam (VIE)	0	0	1	1
Totals (65 entries)		213	211	207	631

== Participating nations ==
Below is the list of countries who agreed to participate in the Championships and the requested number of athlete places for each.

- Afghanistan (2)
- Algeria (15)
- Angola (5)
- Argentina (21)
- Australia (48)
- Austria (6)
- Azerbaijan (10)
- Bahrain (6)
- Belarus (8)
- Belgium (5)
- Bermuda (1)
- Brazil (40)
- Bulgaria (9)
- Cameroon (4)
- Canada (31)
- Cape Verde (2)
- Chile (4)
- China (79)
- Chinese Taipei (4)
- Colombia (8)
- Croatia (14)
- Cuba (6)
- Cyprus (1)
- Czech Republic (14)
- Denmark (7)
- Egypt (14)
- Estonia (3)
- Ethiopia (1)
- Finland (10)
- France (17)
- Germany (31)
- Great Britain (47)
- Greece (22)
- Hong Kong (4)
- Hungary (7)
- Iceland (2)
- India (15)
- Indonesia (7)
- Iran (19)
- Iraq (4)
- Ireland (9)
- Italy (13)
- Jamaica (7)
- Japan (56)
- Jordan (5)
- Kazakhstan (8)
- Kuwait (11)
- Latvia (7)
- Libya (5)
- Lithuania (8)
- Luxembourg (1)
- Macau (5)
- Malaysia (6)
- Mexico (25)
- Moldova (1)
- Mongolia (2)
- Montenegro (3)
- Morocco (9)
- Mozambique (5)
- Namibia (8)
- Netherlands (18)
- New Zealand (8)
- Nicaragua (1)
- Nigeria (7)
- Norway (2)
- Pakistan (3)
- Panama (2)
- Papua New Guinea (2)
- Philippines (1)
- Poland (38)
- Portugal (23)
- Qatar (8)
- Russia (76)
- Rwanda (2)
- Saudi Arabia (5)
- Senegal (2)
- Serbia (5)
- Slovakia (4)
- Slovenia (2)
- South Africa (22)
- Spain (27)
- Sri Lanka (6)
- Sweden (9)
- Switzerland (9)
- Syria (1)
- Thailand (19)
- Trinidad and Tobago (2)
- Tunisia (9)
- Turkey (24)
- Ukraine (31)
- United Arab Emirates (18)
- United States (76)
- Uzbekistan (11)
- Venezuela (5)
- Vietnam (4)
- U.S. Virgin Islands (1)
