= T20 (classification) =

Para-athletics classification

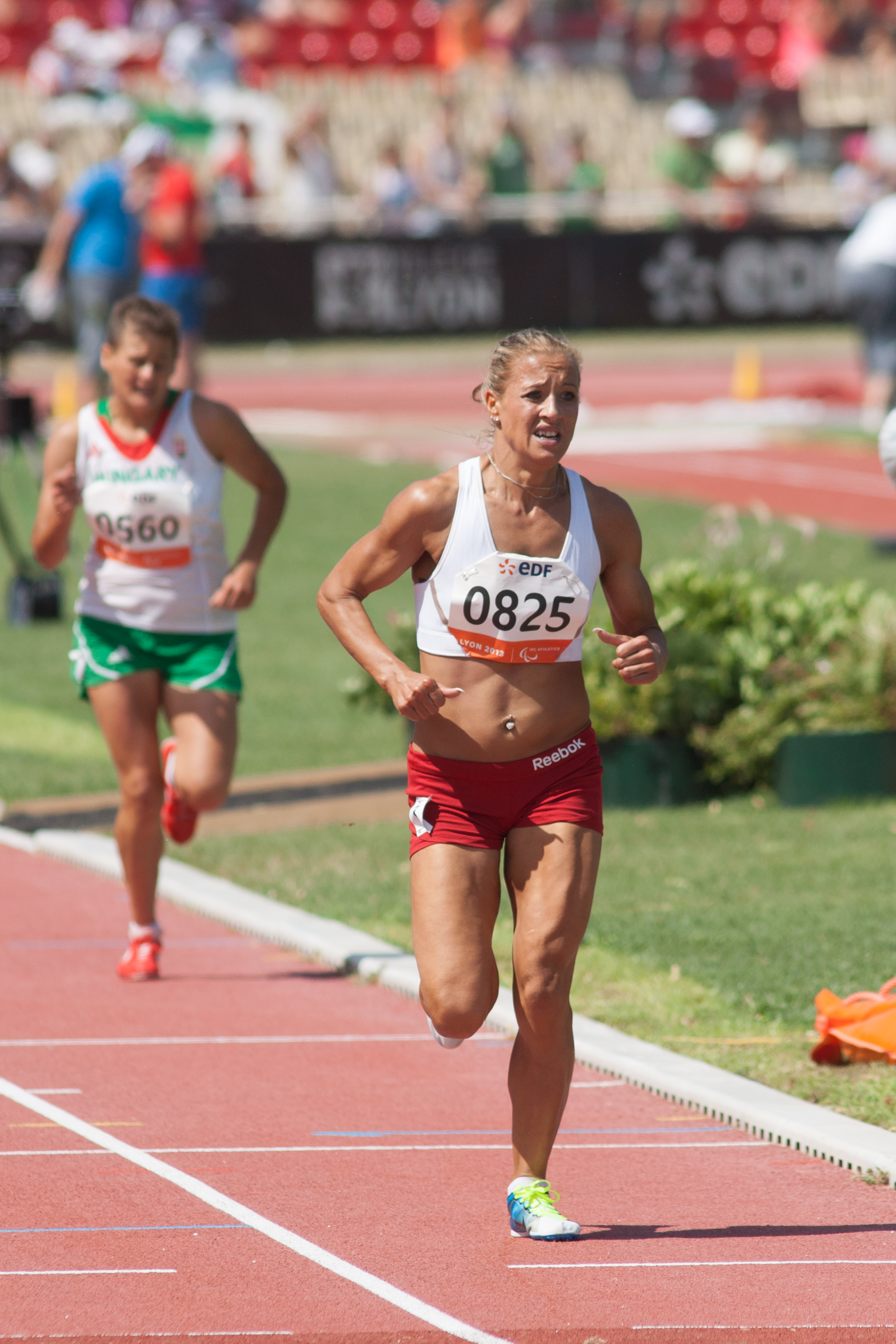
Arleta Meloch, T20 world record holding athlete at three distances

T20 is a disability sport classification for disability athletics in track and jump events. It broadly covers athletes with intellectual disabilities.

== Sport ==
This classification is for disability athletics. This classification broadly covers athletes with intellectual disabilities. The classification by Buckley goes on to say "To become eligible to compete in the Paralympic Games, all athletes with an Intellectual Disability have to reach the primary eligibility criteria, which is determined by:

- An IQ score at or below 75 (A person with an IQ of 100 is considered average)
- Significant limitations in adaptive behaviour (conceptual, social or practical adaptive skills such as communication, self care, social skills, home living, health and safety difficulties)
- Onset acquired before the age of 18

The International Paralympic Committee defined this classification on their website in July 2016 as, "(Intellectual impairment)".

== Performance and rules ==
People in this class are required to use blocks for races 400 meters or less. They can be provided assistance in setting up their blocks if they make a request in advance.

== Events ==
Internationally, events open to this class include the long jump, shot put, 400 meters, 800 meters, 1,500 meters, and 5,000 meters. There may be more events on the national level at the discretion of the national track federation.

Gender	Event	Class	AQS/MQS	BQS	Event
Men's	400 m	T20	49.2	50.46	2016 Summer Paralympics
Women's	400 m	T20	60.27	61.59	2016 Summer Paralympics
Men's	1500 m	T20	03:58.2	04:00.9	2016 Summer Paralympics
Women's	1500 m	T20	04:40.0	04:50.0	2016 Summer Paralympics
Men's	Long jump	T20	7.11	6.74	2016 Summer Paralympics
Women's	Long jump	T20	5.19	5.03	2016 Summer Paralympics

== History ==
The classification was created by the International Paralympic Committee and has roots in a 2003 attempt to address "the overall objective to support and co-ordinate the ongoing development of accurate, reliable, consistent and credible sport focused classification systems and their implementation."

== Competitors ==
Competitors in this class include Hannah Taunton (UK), José Antonio Expósito and José Martínez Morote from Spain, Peyman Nasiri Bazanjani from Iran, and Daniel Pek, Barbara Bieganowska-Zając, Karolina Kucharczyk, Arleta Meloch from Poland and Abdul Latif Romly from Malaysia.

== See also ==
- Para-athletics classification
- Athletics at the Summer Paralympics
- S14, the classification for intellectual disabilities in swimming.
