= Athletics at the 2024 Summer Paralympics – Women's 400 metres T54 =

Women's 400 metres T54 at the XVII Paralympic Games
- Venue: Stade de France
- Dates: 5 September 2024
- Competitors: 13 from 9 nations
- Winning time: 53.05

Medalists
1st place, gold medalist(s)		Lea Bayekula	Belgium
2nd place, silver medalist(s)		Manuela Schär	Switzerland
3rd place, bronze medalist(s)		Zhou Zhaoqian	China

400 metres at the 2024 Summer Paralympics
Men · T11 · T12 · T13 · T20 · T36 · T37 · T38 · T47 · T52 · T53 · T54 · T62
Women · T11 · T12 · T13 · T20 · T37 · T38 · T47 · T53 · T54 ·

The women's 400 metres T54 event at the 2024 Summer Paralympics in Paris took place on 5 September 2024.

The T54 category is for wheelchair athletes with no leg function, but near full arm function and reasonable to normal trunk function. Typically this may be caused by a lower spinal cord injury or spinal cord birth defect.

== Records ==
Before the competition, the existing records were as follows:

World Record	Lea Bayekula (BEL)	50.91	(France) Paris	14 June 2024
Paralympic Record	Chantal Petitclerc (CAN)	51.91	(Greece) Athens	25 September 2004

Area	Time		Athlete	Location	Date
Africa	52.70		(Mauritius) Noemi Alphonse	(United Arab Emirates) Dubai	14 February 2024
America	51.39		(United States) Tatyana McFadden	(Switzerland) Nottwil	9 June 2024
Asia	52.03		(China) Tian Yajuan	(United Arab Emirates) Dubai	28 February 2023
Europe	50.91	WR	(Belgium) Lea Bayekula	(France) Paris	14 June 2024
Oceania	53.24		(Australia) Eliza Ault-Connell	(Switzerland) Arbon	30 May 2019

== Results ==
=== Round 1 ===
First 3 in each heat (Q) and the next 2 fastest (q) advance to the Final.

==== Heat 1 ====
Rank	Lane	Athlete	Nation	Time	Notes
1	4	Manuela Schär	Switzerland	53.69	Q
2	3	Zhou Zhaoqian	China	53.73	Q, SB
3	8	Tatyana McFadden	United States	54.01	Q
4	5	Amanda Kotaja	Finland	54.28	q
5	6	Jéssica Gabrieli Soares Giacomelli	Brazil	56.29	
6	7	Alexandra Helbling	Switzerland	57.26	

==== Heat 2 ====
Rank	Lane	Athlete	Nation	Time	Notes
1	7	Lea Bayekula	Belgium	52.25	Q
2	4	Hannah Dederick	United States	54.62	Q
3	5	Melanie Woods	Great Britain	55.47	Q
4	8	Tian Yajuan	China	55.72	q
5	9	Noemi Alphonse	Mauritius	56.04	
6	6	Licia Mussinelli	Switzerland	57.96	
7	3	Hannah Babalola	Nigeria	1:01.37	

=== Final ===
Rank	Lane	Athlete	Nation	Time	Notes
1st place, gold medalist(s)	5	Lea Bayekula	Belgium	53.05	
2nd place, silver medalist(s)	6	Manuela Schär	Switzerland	53.14	
3rd place, bronze medalist(s)	8	Zhou Zhaoqian	China	54.01	
4	7	Hannah Dederick	United States	54.68	
5	3	Amanda Kotaja	Finland	54.89	
6	9	Melanie Woods	Great Britain	55.39	
7	2	Tian Yajuan	China	55.55	
—	4	Tatyana McFadden	United States	DQ	R18.2(c)
