= Athletics at the 2020 Summer Paralympics – Women's 400 metres T54 =

Women's 400 metres T54 at the XVI Paralympic Games
- Venue: Tokyo National Stadium
- Dates: 2 September 2021 (final)
- Competitors: 13 from 9 nations
- Winning time: 53.59

Medalists
1st place, gold medalist(s)		Manuela Schär	Switzerland
2nd place, silver medalist(s)		Cheri Madsen	United States
3rd place, bronze medalist(s)		Zhou Zhaoqian	China

The women's 400 metres T54 event at the 2020 Summer Paralympics in Tokyo, took place on 2 September 2021.

The T54 category is for wheelchair athletes with no leg function, but near full arm function and reasonable to normal trunk function. Typically this may be caused by a lower spinal cord injury or spinal cord birth defect.

== Records ==
Prior to the competition, the existing records were as follows:

World Record	Tatyana McFadden (USA)	51.90	Arbon, Switzerland	4 June 2015
Paralympic Record	Chantal Petitclerc (CAN)	51.91	Athens, Greece	25 September 2004

Area	Time	Athlete	Nation
Africa	57.52	Marie Desirella Brandy Perrine	Mauritius
America	51.90 WR	Tatyana McFadden	United States
Asia	53.12	Zou Lihong	China
Europe	52.56	Manuela Schär	Switzerland
Oceania	53.24	Eliza Ault-Connell	Australia

== Results ==
=== Heats ===
Heat 1 took place on 2 September 2021, at 12:42:

Rank	Lane	Name	Nationality	Time	Notes
1	4	Manuela Schär	Switzerland	54.29	Q
2	7	Zhou Zhaoqian	China	55.46	Q, SB
3	5	Marie Emmanuelle Anais Alphonse	Mauritius	55.99	Q, AR
4	6	Eliza Ault-Connell	Australia	56.89	q
5	2	Amanda Kotaja	Finland	57.70	
6	3	Hannah Dederick	United States	57.77	
7	8	Zübeyde Süpürgeci	Turkey	59.39	

Heat 2 took place on 2 September 2021, at 12:49:

Rank	Lane	Name	Nationality	Time	Notes
1	8	Cheri Madsen	United States	53.16	Q, SB
2	5	Tatyana McFadden	United States	53.81	Q
3	3	Zou Lihong	China	55.00	Q, SB
4	4	Merle Menje	Germany	55.24	q, PB
5	7	Marie Desirella Brandy Perrine	Mauritius	58.72	
6	6	Mel Woods	Great Britain	59.11	

=== Final ===
The final took place on 2 September, at 19:40:

Rank	Lane	Name	Nationality	Time	Notes
1st place, gold medalist(s)	4	Manuela Schär	Switzerland	53.59	
2nd place, silver medalist(s)	3	Cheri Madsen	United States	53.91	
3rd place, bronze medalist(s)	6	Zhou Zhaoqian	China	54.10	PB
4	5	Tatyana McFadden	United States	54.35	
5	8	Zou Lihong	China	54.82	SB
6	7	Marie Emmanuelle Anais Alphonse	Mauritius	56.15	
7	2	Eliza Ault-Connell	Australia	56.54	
8	1	Merle Menje	Germany	56.69	
