= Léa Bayekula =

Belgian wheelchair racer

Personal information
- Born: 26 April 1995 (age 31) Brussels, Belgium

Sport
- Country: Belgium
- Sport: Para athletics
- Disability: Spina bifida
- Disability class: T54
- Events: 100 metres 400 metres 800 metres 1500 metres
- Club: Royal White Star Athletic Club
- Team: Red Velvet Racing Team
- Coached by: Arno Mul
Medal record
Representing Belgium
Paralympic Games
Gold medal – first place	2024 Paris	100 m T54
Gold medal – first place	2024 Paris	400 m T54
World Championships
Gold medal – first place	2025 New Delhi	400 m T54
Gold medal – first place	2025 New Delhi	800 m T54
European Championships
Bronze medal – third place	2021 Bydgoszcz	100 m T54

Léa Bayekula (born 26 April 1995) is a Belgian wheelchair racer who competes in international track and field competitions. She is reigning Paralympic 100m and 400m champion in T54 racing, after previously breaking through with a European bronze medal in 2021.

== Biography ==
Léa Bayekula was born with spina bifida in a family of 8 where she and her twin sister are the oldest children. She was 6 years old when, after years of training, she finally mastered how to walk. Her parents always made it a point of honor that she should join a traditional school and not an institution for children with disabilities.

== Athletics career ==
First coming to public attention by reaching the final of Belgium's Got Talent with her gospel choir in 2013, Bayekula discovered parasports by chance at the age of 15 during a general public day organised in Brussels by the Ligue handisport francophone. She first practiced wheelchair basketball for three years. Then, after seeing a demonstration by Belgian Paralympic athlete Marieke Vervoort of what she could do with her wheelchair, she switched to para-athletics at age 18, specializing in 100 to 400 metres.

Bayekula's first success came in 2017 when she became Belgian national champion for the first time in the T54 200 metres. From there on, there followed more national titles: in 2020 and 2021 in the 100 metres and 400 metres T54, in 2023 in the 100 metres T54, in 2024 in the 100 and 400 metres T54.

Her first international success came in 2021 when she won the bronze medal in the 100 metres T54 at the European Championships in Bydgoszcz, Poland.

Moving to Dutch coach Arno Mul, Bayekula finished fourth in the 400 metres at the 2023 World Para Athletics Championships in Paris and seventh in the 1500 metres, but missed out on the 100 metres final by finishing third in her semi-final behind Noemi Alphonse of Mauritius and China's Luo Shuimei, ranking her ninth overall. Skipping the 2024 World Championships in Kobe, Bayekula broke an international record for the first time when she set a new European record of 51.89 seconds in the 400 metres T54 at the Sharjah 2024 International Open Para Athletics Meeting in February 2024, finishing second behind world record holder Tatyana McFadden of the USA. The following June, Bayekula went on to break McFadden's world record at the Mémorial Daniela Jutzeler in Arbon, Switzerland, posting a time of 51.13 seconds, and then broke her own record at the Grand Prix de Paris at Stade Charléty, making history in becoming the first 400 metres T54 athlete under 51 seconds posting a time of 50.91 seconds, putting her on the road to claim both the 100 metres and 400 metres titles at the 2024 Paralympic Games at the Stade de France.

Bayekula started the first Paralympics of her career with a win in the heats of the 800 metres, progressing her through to the final, where after leading for a long time she eventually finished fifth, with gold won by Manuela Schaer of Switzerland.

In the 100 metres, Bayekula again won her semi-final heat in a time of 15.87 seconds, ahead of Alphonse and Hannah Dederick of the US, beaten only by Tatyana McFadden's Paralympic record of 15.55 seconds from the other semi-final. The two fastest performers from the morning semis would again outperform the rest of the field in the final held that evening, with Bayekula breaking McFadden's new Paralympic record by 0.05 seconds, for a new Paralympic mark of 15.50. McFadden herself won silver in 15.67 with training colleague Amanda Kotaja of Finland third in 15.77, and Alphonse fourth.

By holding the 400 metres world record, Bayekula was considered among the medal favourites at the one-lap distance in Paris the following night. The Belgian winning her semi-final as she had previously done in the 100m and 800m, clocking the fastest time in the round by almost a second-and-a-half. Her mark of 52.25 seconds was well clear of Schaer's winning time in the other semi-final of 53.69.

A tight sprint in the final saw Bayekula hold off Schaer to claim her second gold medal of the week in a time of 53.05 seconds, with Schaer second in 53.14, and China's Zhou Zhaoqian third in 54.01.

Bayekula was among the Belgian Olympic and Paralympic medallists honoured at the Memorial Van Damme Diamond League meeting at the King Baudouin Stadium after the Paris Games.

== Personal ==
Bayekula joined the gospel choir, Voice of Angels, when she was 6. She enjoyed going to concerts with the choir. With the choir she even reached the finals of "Belgium's got Talent" in 2013 on RTL-TVI, a French-language channel in Belgium.

She practiced contemporary dance since the age of 17, modeled and dreamed of becoming an actress She was an ambassador of Unrun (42/54), the Belgian activewear label founded by Belgium's 2024 Summer Olympic Games gold medal winners Elodie Ouedraogo and Olivia Borlée.

She became a Handicap International Ambassador in 2021.

She has appeared in multiple TV documentaries: "Croire malgré tout" (Believe in Spite of Everything), EX AEQUO! (Ten inspiring stories of professional athletes facing discrimination based on race, gender, sexual orientation and disability) and "Paralympique".

Her idol and role model, and good friend, is Belgium's 400 metres runner Cynthia Bolingo who she first met in the bath rooms at one of her first competitions in 2016.

In 2026, the Place Léa Bayekula/Léa Bayekulaplein in the Heysel neighbourhood of Brussels, Belgium, was named in her honour.
