= Athletics at the 2020 Summer Paralympics – Women's 800 metres T54 =

Women's 800 metres T54 at the XVI Paralympic Games
- Venue: Tokyo National Stadium
- Dates: 29 August 2021 (final)
- Competitors: 11 from 7 nations
- Winning time: 1:42.81

Medalists
1st place, gold medalist(s)		Manuela Schär	Switzerland
2nd place, silver medalist(s)		Tatyana McFadden	United States
3rd place, bronze medalist(s)		Susannah Scaroni	United States

The women's 800 metres T54 event at the 2020 Summer Paralympics in Tokyo, took place on 29 August 2021.

The T54 category is for wheelchair athletes with no leg function, but near full arm function and reasonable to normal trunk function. Typically this may be caused by a lower spinal cord injury or spinal cord birth defect.

== Records ==
Prior to the competition, the existing records were as follows:

World Record	Manuela Schär (SUI)	1:41.47	Nottwil, Switzerland	18 August 2019
Paralympic Record	Tatyana McFadden (USA)	1:44.73	Rio de Janeiro, Brazil	17 September 2016

Area	Time	Athlete	Nation
Africa	1:54.60	Marie Emmanuelle Anais Alphonse	Mauritius
America	1:42.72	Tatyana McFadden	United States
Asia	1:42.38	Zou Lihong	China
Europe	1:41.47 WR	Manuela Schär	Switzerland
Oceania	1:42.35	Eliza Ault-Connell	Australia

== Results ==
=== Heats ===
Heat 1 took place on 29 August 2021, at 10:57:

Rank	Lane	Name	Nationality	Time	Notes
1	8	Tatyana McFadden	United States	1:52.91	Q
2	6	Merle Menje	Germany	1:53.06	Q
3	7	Zübeyde Süpürgeci	Turkey	1:54.11	Q, PB
4	5	Zou Lihong	China	1:54.18	SB
5	4	Patricia Eachus	Switzerland	1:58.64	
	3	Marie Perrine	Mauritius	DNF	

Heat 2 took place on 29 August 2021, at 11:07:

Rank	Lane	Name	Nationality	Time	Notes
1	7	Manuela Schär	Switzerland	1:51.09	Q
2	6	Susannah Scaroni	United States	1:51.42	Q
3	4	Amanda McGrory	United States	1:51.67	Q
4	3	Mel Woods	Great Britain	1:52.05	q, PB
5	5	Marie Alphonse	Mauritius	1:52.27	q, AR

=== Final ===
The final took place on 29 August 2021, at 19:17:

Rank	Lane	Name	Nationality	Time	Notes
1st place, gold medalist(s)	5	Manuela Schär	Switzerland	1:42.81	GR
2nd place, silver medalist(s)	4	Tatyana McFadden	United States	1:43.16	SB
3rd place, bronze medalist(s)	6	Susannah Scaroni	United States	1:44.43	SB
4	7	Merle Menje	Germany	1:46.43	
5	3	Mel Woods	Great Britain	1:50.40	PB
6	8	Amanda McGrory	United States	1:52.59	
7	2	Marie Alphonse	Mauritius	1:53.30	
8	9	Zübeyde Süpürgeci	Turkey	1:54.87	
