= Athletics at the 2020 Summer Paralympics – Women's 100 metres T54 =

Women's 100 metres T54 at the XVI Paralympic Games
- Venue: Tokyo National Stadium
- Dates: 1 September 2021 (final)
- Competitors: 10 from 8 nations
- Winning time: 15.90

Medalists
1st place, gold medalist(s)		Zhou Zhaoqian	China
2nd place, silver medalist(s)		Amanda Kotaja	Finland
3rd place, bronze medalist(s)		Cheri Madsen	United States

The women's 100 metres T54 event at the 2020 Summer Paralympics in Tokyo, took place on 1 September 2021.

The T54 category is for wheelchair athletes with no leg function, but near full arm function and reasonable to normal trunk function. Typically this may be caused by a lower spinal cord injury or spinal cord birth defect.

== Records ==
Prior to the competition, the existing records were as follows:

World Record	Tatyana McFadden (USA)	15.35	Indianapolis, United States	5 June 2016
Paralympic Record	Liu Wenjun (CHN)	15.82	London, United Kingdom	8 September 2012

Area	Time	Athlete	Nation
Africa	16.57	Marie Emmanuelle Anais Alphonse	Mauritius
America	15.35 WR	Tatyana McFadden	United States
Asia	15.82	Liu Wenjun	China
Europe	15.64	Amanda Kotaja	Finland
Oceania	16.21	Eliza Ault-Connell	Australia

== Results ==
=== Heats ===
Heat 1 took place on 1 September 2021, at 12:15:

Rank	Lane	Name	Nationality	Time	Notes
1	5	Zhou Zhaoqian	China	15.80	Q, GR
2	4	Hannah Dederick	United States	16.21	Q, PB
3	3	Zübeyde Süpürgeci	Turkey	16.63	Q, SB
4	6	Eliza Ault-Connell	Australia	16.79	q, SB
5	7	Marie Desirella Brandy Perrine	Mauritius	17.33	

Heat 2 took place on 1 September 2021, at 12:22:

Rank	Lane	Name	Nationality	Time	Notes
1	4	Amanda Kotaja	Finland	16.43	Q
2	5	Cheri Madsen	United States	16.60	Q
3	3	Marie Emannuelle Anais Alphonse	Mauritius	16.71	Q
4	7	Momoka Muraoka	Japan	17.10	q
5	6	Fatou Sanneh	The Gambia	24.10	

=== Final ===
The final took place on 1 September 2021, at 20:46:

Rank	Lane	Name	Nationality	Time	Notes
1st place, gold medalist(s)	7	Zhou Zhaoqian	China	15.90	
2nd place, silver medalist(s)	6	Amanda Kotaja	Finland	15.93	SB
3rd place, bronze medalist(s)	5	Cheri Madsen	United States	16.33	SB
4	4	Hannah Dederick	United States	16.36	
5	9	Marie Emannuelle Anais Alphonse	Mauritius	16.48	AR
6	2	Momoka Muraoka	Japan	16.71	
7	8	Zübeyde Süpürgeci	Turkey	16.86	
8	3	Eliza Ault-Connell	Australia	17.12	
