= Athletics at the 2024 Summer Paralympics – Women's 100 metres T54 =

Women's 100 metres T54 at the XVII Paralympic Games
- Venue: Stade de France
- Dates: 4 September 2024
- Competitors: 14 from 11 nations
- Winning time: 15.50

Medalists
| 1st place, gold medalist(s) | | Léa Bayekula | Belgium |
| 2nd place, silver medalist(s) | | Tatyana McFadden | United States |
| 3rd place, bronze medalist(s) | | Amanda Kotaja | Finland |

100 metres at the 2024 Summer Paralympics
Men · T11 · T12 · T13 · T34 · T35 · T36 · T37 · T38 · T44 · T47 · T51 · T52 · T53 · T54 · T63 · T64
Women · T11 · T12 · T13 · T34 · T35 · T36 · T37 · T38 · T47 · T53 · T54 · T63 · T64

The women's 100 metres T54 event at the 2024 Summer Paralympics in Paris, took place on 4 September 2024.

The T54 category is for wheelchair athletes with no leg function, but near full arm function and reasonable to normal trunk function. Typically this may be caused by a lower spinal cord injury or spinal cord birth defect.

== Records ==
Prior to the competition, the existing records were as follows:

| World record | Tatyana McFadden (USA) | 15.35 | Indianapolis, United States | 5 June 2016 |
| Paralympic record | Zhou Zhaoqian (CHN) | 15.80 | Tokyo, Japan | 1 September 2021 |

| Area | Time | | Athlete | Location | Date |
|---|---|---|---|---|---|
| Africa | 15.84 | | (Mauritius) Noemi Alphonse | (Switzerland) Nottwil | 8 June 2024 |
| America | 15.35 | WR | (United States) Tatyana McFadden | (United States) Indianapolis | 5 June 2016 |
| Asia | 15.80 | | (China) Zhou Zhaoqian | (Japan) Tokyo | 1 September 2021 |
| Europe | 15.36 | | (Finland) Amanda Kotaja | (Switzerland) Nottwil | 27 May 2023 |
| Oceania | 16.21 | | (Australia) Eliza Ault-Connell | (Switzerland) Arbon | 30 May 2019 |

== Results ==
=== Round 1 ===
First 3 in each heat (Q) and the next 2 fastest (q) advance to the Final.

==== Heat 1 ====
| Rank | Lane | Athlete | Nation | Time | Notes |
|---|---|---|---|---|---|
| 1 | 6 | Tatyana McFadden | United States | 15.55 | Q, PR, SB |
| 2 | 3 | Amanda Kotaja | Finland | 16.00 | Q |
| 3 | 5 | Marie Perrine | Mauritius | 16.46 | Q |
| 4 | 2 | Zhou Zhaoqian | China | 16.57 | q |
| 5 | 8 | Licia Mussinelli | Switzerland | 16.95 | |
| 6 | 4 | Hannah Bablola | Nigeria | 17.39 | |
| 7 | 7 | Katrin Kohl | Luxembourg | 20.39 | |
| Source: | | | | Wind: -0.3 m/s | |

==== Heat 2 ====
| Rank | Lane | Athlete | Nation | Time | Notes |
|---|---|---|---|---|---|
| 1 | 2 | Léa Bayekula | Belgium | 15.87 | Q |
| 2 | 4 | Noemi Alphonse | Mauritius | 16.07 | Q |
| 3 | 5 | Hannah Dederick | United States | 16.64 | Q |
| 4 | 3 | Alexandra Hiebling | Switzerland | 16.90 | q |
| 5 | 6 | Shauna Bocquet | Ireland | 17.00 | |
| 6 | 9 | Jessia Soares Giacomelli | Brazil | 17.04 | PB |
| - | 7 | Fatou Sanneh | The Gambia | DNS | |
| Source: | | | | Wind: -0.7 m/s | |

=== Final ===
| Rank | Lane | Athlete | Nation | Time | Notes |
|---|---|---|---|---|---|
| 1st place, gold medalist(s) | 7 | Léa Bayekula | Belgium | 15.50 | PR, PB |
| 2nd place, silver medalist(s) | 4 | Tatyana McFadden | United States | 15.67 | |
| 3rd place, bronze medalist(s) | 6 | Amanda Kotaja | Finland | 15.77 | |
| 4 | 5 | Noemi Alphonse | Mauritius | 16.11 | |
| 5 | 2 | Zhou Zhaoqian | China | 16.44 | |
| 6 | 8 | Hannah Dederick | United States | 16.50 | |
| 7 | 9 | Alexandra Hiebling | Switzerland | 16.91 | |
| 8 | 3 | Marie Perrine | Mauritius | 16.98 | |
| Source: | | | | Wind: -0.1 m/s | |
