= Athletics at the 2024 Summer Paralympics – Women's 1500 metres T54 =

Women's 1500 metres T54 at the XVII Paralympic Games
- Venue: Stade de France
- Dates: 2 September 2024 (round 1); 3 September 2024 (final)
- Competitors: 15 from 9 nations
- Winning time: 3:13.10 PR

Medalists
| 1st place, gold medalist(s) | | Catherine Debrunner | Switzerland |
| 2nd place, silver medalist(s) | | Samantha Kinghorn | Great Britain |
| 3rd place, bronze medalist(s) | | Susannah Scaroni | United States |

1500 metres at the 2024 Summer Paralympics
Men's · T11 · T13 · T20 · T38 · T46 · T54 · Women's · T11 · T13 · T20 · T54

The women's 1500 metres T54 event at the 2024 Summer Paralympics in Paris, took place on 2 and 3 September 2024.

The T54 category is for wheelchair athletes with no leg function, but near full arm function and reasonable to normal trunk function. Typically this may be caused by a lower spinal cord injury or spinal cord birth defect.

== Records ==
Prior to the competition, the existing records were as follows:

| World record | Catherine Debrunner (SUI) | 3:05.41 | (Switzerland) Nottwil | 8 June 2024 |
| Paralympic record | Tatyana McFadden (USA) | 3:22.50 | (Brazil) Rio de Janeiro | 13 September 2016 |

| Area | Time | | Athlete | Location | Date |
|---|---|---|---|---|---|
| Africa | 3:21.13 | | (Mauritius) Noemi Alphonse | (United Arab Emirates) Dubai | 13 February 2024 |
| America | 3:11.92 | | (United States) Susannah Scaroni | (Switzerland) Nottwil | 9 June 2024 |
| Asia | 3:19.96 | | (China) Zhou Zhaoqian | (United Arab Emirates) Dubai | 27 February 2023 |
| Europe | 3:05.41 | WR | (Switzerland) Catherine Debrunner | (Switzerland) Nottwil | 8 June 2024 |
| Oceania | 3:13.27 | | (Australia) Madison de Rozario | (Switzerland) Nottwil | 26 May 2018 |

== Results ==
=== Round 1 ===
First 5 in each heat (Q) advance to the Final.

==== Heat 1 ====
| Rank | Athlete | Nation | Time | Notes |
|---|---|---|---|---|
| 1 | Susannah Scaroni | United States | 3:19.84 | Q, PR |
| 2 | Madison de Rozario | Australia | 3:20.09 | Q |
| 3 | Manuela Schär | Switzerland | 3:20.20 | Q |
| 4 | Tian Yajuan | China | 3:20.42 | Q, PB |
| 5 | Melanie Woods | Great Britain | 3:20.70 | Q |
| 6 | Merle Menje | Germany | 3:21.86 | |
| 7 | Eden Rainbow-Cooper | Great Britain | 3:29.44 | qR |
| 8 | Vanessa Cristina de Souza | Brazil | 3:30.86 | |

==== Heat 2 ====
| Rank | Athlete | Nation | Time | Notes |
|---|---|---|---|---|
| 1 | Catherine Debrunner | Switzerland | 3:34.74 | Q |
| 2 | Samantha Kinghorn | Great Britain | 3:34.83 | Q |
| 3 | Zhou Zhaoqian | China | 3:34.98 | Q |
| 4 | Patricia Eachus | Switzerland | 3:35.12 | Q |
| 5 | Aline Rocha | Brazil | 3:35.18 | Q |
| 6 | Shauna Bocquet | Ireland | 3:35.26 | |
| 7 | Jenna Fesemyer | United States | 3:38.10 | |

=== Final ===
| Rank | Athlete | Nation | Time | Notes |
|---|---|---|---|---|
| 1st place, gold medalist(s) | Catherine Debrunner | Switzerland | 3:13.10 | PR |
| 2nd place, silver medalist(s) | Samantha Kinghorn | Great Britain | 3:16.01 | |
| 3rd place, bronze medalist(s) | Susannah Scaroni | United States | 3:16.68 | |
| 4 | Patricia Eachus | Switzerland | 3:18.38 | |
| 5 | Madison de Rozario | Australia | 3:20.32 | |
| 6 | Tian Yajuan | China | 3:20.54 | |
| 7 | Eden Rainbow-Cooper | Great Britain | 3:22.09 | |
| 8 | Melanie Woods | Great Britain | 3:23.37 | |
| 9 | Aline Rocha | Brazil | 3:23.43 | |
| 10 | Zhou Zhaoqian | China | 3:53.20 | |
| — | Manuela Schär | Switzerland | DQ | R18.4 |
