= Athletics at the 2026 Commonwealth Games – Women's 400 metres (T54) =

Women's 400 metres (T54) at the 2026 Commonwealth Games
- Venue: Scotstoun Stadium, Glasgow
- Dates: 31 July 2026 (heats); 1 August (final)

Medalists
gold medal	Melanie Woods	Scotland
silver medal	Noemi Alphonse	Mauritius
bronze medal	Jessica Lewis	Bermuda

The women's 400 metres (T54) event at the 2026 Commonwealth Games, also referred to as the women's 400 metres T53/54 event, as part of the para-athletics programme, will take place at the Scotstoun Stadium on 31 July and 1 August 2026.

The event is open to female para-athletes in the T53 and T54 classification for para-athletes with a lower limb impairment who compete in a racing wheelchair, with the T53 athletes being more impaired in their trunk function. This is a new event on the Games programme.

== Records ==
Prior to this competition, the existing world and Games records were as follows:

Records T53
World record	49.02	Catherine Debrunner (SUI)	Arbon, Switzerland	31 May 2025
Records T54
World record	50.46	Tatyana McFadden (USA)	Arbon, Switzerland	31 May 2025

== Schedule ==
The schedule is as follows:

Date	Time	Round
31 July 2026	10:00	First round
1 August 2026	18:30	Final

All times are United Kingdom time (UTC+1)

== Results ==
=== First round ===
The first round is scheduled for the morning session of 31 July 2026.

==== Heat 1 ====
Place	Lane	Athlete	Nation	Time	Notes
1	6	Melanie Woods	Scotland	56.74	Q,SB
2	4	Marie Desirella Brandy Perrine	Mauritius	58.59	Q,SB
3	5	Eliza Ault-Connell	Australia	59.63	Q,SB
4	7	Aimee Fisher	Australia	1:12.27	q,SB

==== Heat 2 ====
Place	Lane	Athlete	Nation	Time	Notes
1	7	Noemi Alphonse	Mauritius	58.31	Q, SB
2	4	Jessica Cooper Lewis	Bermuda	58.90	Q, SB
3	5	Nandini Sharma	Canada	59.20	Q, SB
4	6	Joanna Robertson	Scotland	1:06.32	q, SB
5	3	Mikaela Dingley	Australia	1:16.95	SB

=== Final ===
The final of the women's 400 metres (T54) is scheduled for the evening session of 1 August 2026.

Place	Lane	Athlete	Nation	Time	Notes
1st place, gold medalist(s)	5	Melanie Woods	Scotland	56.43	SB
2nd place, silver medalist(s)	4	Noemi Alphonse	Mauritius	57.89	SB
3rd place, bronze medalist(s)	6	Jessica Lewis	Bermuda	59.31	
4	3	Nandini Sharma	Canada	59.98	
5	8	Eliza Ault-Connell	Australia	1:00.15	
6	7	Marie Desirella Brandy Perrine	Mauritius	1:00.43	
7	2	Joanna Robertson	Scotland	1:06.66	
8	1	Aimee Fisher	Australia	1:13.55	
