= Mauritius at the 2024 Summer Paralympics =

- IPC code: MRI
- NPC: Mauritius National Paralympic Committee

in Paris, France August 28, 2024 – September 8, 2024
- Competitors: 6 in 1 sport
- Flag bearers: Noemi Alphonse; Roberto Michel
- Medals Ranked 79th: Gold 0 Silver 0 Bronze 1 Total 1

Summer Paralympics appearances (overview)
- 1996; 2000; 2004; 2008; 2012; 2016; 2020; 2024

Mauritius competed at the 2024 Summer Paralympics in Paris, France, from 28 August to 8 September.

== Medalists ==
Medal	Name	Sport	Event	Date
Bronze	Yovanni Philippe	Athletics	Men's 400 metres T20	3 September

== Competitors ==
The following is the list of number of competitors in the Games.

Sport	Men	Women	Total
Athletics	2	3	5
Total	2	3	5

== Athletics ==
Mauritian track and field athletes achieved quota places for the following events based on their results at the 2023 World Championships, 2024 World Championships, or through high performance allocation, as long as they meet the minimum entry standard (MES).

Key

- Note–Ranks given for track events are within the athlete's heat only
- Q = Qualified for the next round
- q = Qualified for the next round as a fastest loser or, in field events, by position without achieving the qualifying target
- DQ = Disqualified
- PR = Paralympic Record
- AR = Area (or continental) Record
- NR = National Record
- SB = Season's Best
- N/A = Round not applicable for the event
- Bye = Athlete not required to compete in round

Track & road events

Athlete	Event	Heat		Final	
Athlete	Event	Result	Rank	Result	Rank
Roberto Michel	Men's 100 m T34	16.01	5	Did not advance	
Yovanni Philippe	Men's 400 metres T20	—		48.30 SB	3rd place, bronze medalist(s)
Marie Perrine	Women's 100 m T54	16.46	3 Q	16.98	8
Noemi Alphonse	Women's 100 m T54	16.07	2 Q	16.11	4
Noemi Alphonse	Women's 800 m T54	1:51.04	6	Did not advance	

Field events

Athlete	Event	Final	
Athlete	Event	Distance	Position
Anaïs Angeline	Women's long jump T37	4.28	6
Eddy Capdor	Men's long jump T20	6.21	10

== See also ==
- Mauritius at the 2024 Summer Olympics
- Mauritius at the Paralympics
