= Athletics at the 2016 Summer Paralympics – Women's 100 metres T54 =

Women's 100 metres T54 at the XV Paralympic Games
- Venue: Estádio Olímpico João Havelange
- Dates: 9 September 2016
- Competitors: 11 from 8 nations

Medalists
1st place, gold medalist(s)		Wenjun Liu	China
2nd place, silver medalist(s)		Tatyana McFadden	United States
3rd place, bronze medalist(s)		Yingjie Li	China

The T54 category is for wheelchair athletes with no leg function, but near full arm function and reasonable to normal trunk function. Typically this may be caused by a lower spinal cord injury or spinal cord birth defect.

The women's 100 metres T54 event at the 2016 Paralympic Games took place on 9 September 2016, at the Estádio Olímpico João Havelange.

== Heats ==
=== Heat 1 ===
19:01 8 September 2016:

Rank	Lane	Bib	Name	Nationality	Reaction	Time	Notes
1	5	170	Wenjun Liu	China		16.00	Q
2	4	906	Tatyana McFadden	United States		16.52	Q
3	7	905	Hannah McFadden	United States		16.55	Q
4	3	615	Margriet van den Broek	Netherlands		17.64	q
5	6	850	Zubeyde Supurgeci	Turkey		17.93	

=== Heat 2 ===
19:09 8 September 2016:

Rank	Lane	Bib	Name	Nationality	Reaction	Time	Notes
1	5	167	Yingjie Li	China		16.42	Q
2	7	903	Cheri Madsen	United States		16.56	Q
3	4	297	Amanda Kotaja	Finland		16.76	Q
4	8	625	Hannah Babalola	Nigeria		17.24	q
5	6	592	Brandy Perrine	Mauritius		18.09	
6	3	47	Jemima Moore	Australia		18.39	

== Final ==
19:14 9 September 2016:

Rank	Lane	Bib	Name	Nationality	Reaction	Time	Notes
1st place, gold medalist(s)	4	170	Wenjun Liu	China		16.00	
2nd place, silver medalist(s)	5	906	Tatyana McFadden	United States		16.13	
3rd place, bronze medalist(s)	6	167	Yingjie Li	China		16.22	
4	8	905	Hannah McFadden	United States		16.34	
5	3	903	Cheri Madsen	United States		16.40	
6	7	297	Amanda Kotaja	Finland		16.47	
7	1	625	Hannah Babalola	Nigeria		16.85	
8	2	615	Margriet van den Broek	Netherlands		17.42	
