= Mauritius at the 2016 Summer Paralympics =

- IPC code: MRI
- NPC: Mauritius National Paralympic Committee

in Rio de Janeiro
- Competitors: 2 in 2 sports
- Flag bearer: Scody Victor
- Medals: Gold 0 Silver 0 Bronze 0 Total 0

Summer Paralympics appearances (overview)
- 1996; 2000; 2004; 2008; 2012; 2016; 2020; 2024

Mauritius sent a delegation to compete at the 2016 Summer Paralympics in Rio de Janeiro, Brazil, from 7–18 September 2016. This was the fifth time the country had taken part in a Paralympic Games after its debut at the 1996 Summer Paralympics. The Mauritian delegation to Rio de Janeiro consisted of two athletes: wheelchair racer Brandy Perrine and short-distance swimmer Scody Victor. The nation's best result was tenth overall by Perrine in the women's 100 metres T54 event as both competitors did not progress to the final in their respective competitions.

== Background ==
Mauritius first joined the Paralympic movement at the 1996 Summer Paralympics in Atlanta, United States. They missed the 2000 Summer Paralympics, then returned for the 2004 Athens Paralympics and have competed at every Summer Paralympic Games since. Thus, these Rio de Janeiro Paralympics were Mauritius' fifth appearance at a Summer Paralympiad. The 2016 Summer Paralympics were held from 7–18 September 2016 with a total of 4,328 athletes representing 159 National Paralympic Committees taking part. The country sent a delegation of two athletes to Rio de Janeiro: wheelchair racer Brandy Perrine and short-distance swimmer Scody Victor. They were joined by chef de mission Reynolds Permal and coaches Sanjay Bookun and Édouard Ah Piang. Victor was chosen as the flag bearer for the parade of nations during the opening ceremony.

== Disability classifications ==
Every participant at the Paralympics has their disability grouped into one of five disability categories; amputation, the condition may be congenital or sustained through injury or illness; cerebral palsy; wheelchair athletes, there is often overlap between this and other categories; visual impairment, including blindness; Les autres, any physical disability that does not fall strictly under one of the other categories, for example dwarfism or multiple sclerosis. Each Paralympic sport then has its own classifications, dependent upon the specific physical demands of competition. Events are given a code, made of numbers and letters, describing the type of event and classification of the athletes competing. Some sports, such as athletics, divide athletes by both the category and severity of their disabilities, other sports, for example swimming, group competitors from different categories together, the only separation being based on the severity of the disability.

== Athletics ==
Brandy Perrine was 18 years old at the time of the Rio Summer Paralympics, and was making her debut at the Paralympic Games. She was born with a condition that has impaired the muscle power in both of her knees and is classified as T54. Perrine uses a wheelchair to compete. She qualified for Games because her time of 18.89 seconds at the Berlin Open Grand Prix 2016 was 0.01 seconds below the "B" qualifying standard for the women's 100 metres T54 event. Her participation at the Berlin Open Grand Prix served as preparation for the Paralympics and she also attended the IPC Athletics Grand Prix Final in London the week after. Perrine set herself the target of lowering her personal best and she said she was confident for her event. On 8 September, she participated in the heats of the women's 100 metres T54, and was assigned to the second heat. Perrine completed the race with a new national record time of 18:09 seconds, fifth out of six in her heat, and her competition came to a conclusion because only the top eight runners advanced to the next stage of the competition and she was tenth overall.

=== Women's Track ===
Athlete	Events	Heat		Final	
Athlete	Events	Time	Rank	Time	Rank
Marie Perrine	100 m T54	18.09	5	did not advance	

== Swimming ==
Scody Victor, a veteran of the 2012 Summer Paralympics, was 27 years old at the time of the Rio Summer Games. He is classified as S9 because he has a limb deficiency and he uses prosthetic legs to aid in his mobility. The Bipartite Commission invited Victor to partake at the Rio de Janeiro Paralympics. He took part in competitions organised by the Mauritian Swimming Federation to prepare for the Games. Victor said before the Paralympics that he was happy to be in Rio de Janeiro and stated that he did not put pressure on himself, "I have lowered the pace of my training since yesterday, so I can recover enough for the competition. I do not know my opponents yet, but I will give everything in the pool to improve my time and qualify for the final." In the heats of the men's 100 metres freestyle S9 on 12 September, he was drawn into heat two. Victor finished the heat seventh and last of all swimmers with a time of one minute and 15.15 seconds. Only the top eight overall fastest swimmers could progress to the final, and he was eliminated because he was 20th overall.

=== Men ===
Athlete	Events	Heats		Final	
Athlete	Events	Time	Rank	Time	Rank
Scody Victor	100 m freestyle S9	1:15.15	20	did not advance	

== See also ==
- Mauritius at the 2016 Summer Olympics
