= Athletics at the 2018 Commonwealth Games – Women's marathon (T54) =

International sporting competition

Women's marathon (T54) at the 2018 Commonwealth Games
- Venue: Southport Broadwater Parklands
- Dates: 15 April
- Competitors: 8 from 5 nations
- Winning time: 1:44:00

Medalists
gold medal	Madison de Rozario	Australia
silver medal	Eliza Ault-Connell	Australia
bronze medal	Jade Jones	England

The women's marathon (T54) at the 2018 Commonwealth Games, as part of the athletics programme, was held in Southport Broadwater Parklands, Gold Coast on 15 April 2018. The event was open to para-sport athletes competing under the T53 / T54 classifications.

== Records ==
Prior to this competition, the existing world record was as follows:

World record	Manuela Schär (SUI)	1:38:07 (T53/54)	Ōita, Japan	27 October 2013
World record	Wakako Tsuchida (JPN)	1:38:07 (T53/54)	Ōita, Japan	27 October 2013

== Schedule ==
The schedule was as follows:

Date	Time	Round
Sunday 15 April 2018	6:10	Race

All times are Australian Eastern Standard Time (UTC+10)

== Results ==
The results were as follows:

Rank	Name	Sport Class	Result	Notes
1st place, gold medalist(s)	Madison de Rozario (AUS)	T53	1:44:00	
2nd place, silver medalist(s)	Eliza Ault-Connell (AUS)	T54	1:44:13	
3rd place, bronze medalist(s)	Jade Jones (ENG)	T54	1:44:20	
4	Samantha Kinghorn (SCO)	T53	1:45:02	
5	Diane Roy (CAN)	T54	1:50:13	
6	Nicole Emerson (ENG)	T53	1:50:13	SB
7	Marie Emmanuelle Anais Alphonse (MRI)	T54	2:11:59	
–	Jessica Frotten (CAN)	T53	DNS	
