= 2024 World Para Athletics Championships – Women's 800 metres =

The women's 800 metres at the 2024 World Para Athletics Championships were held in Kobe.

== Medalists ==
Event	Gold	Silver	Bronze
T34	Hannah Cockroft; Great Britain	Lan Hanyu; China	Liu Panpan; China
T53	Zhou Hongzhuan; China	Gao Fang; China	Hamide Doğangün; Turkey
T54	Merle Menje; Germany	Zhou Zhaoqian; China	Tian Yajuan; China

== T34 ==
The event final took place on 24 May.

Rank	Lane	Name	Nationality	Time	Notes
1st place, gold medalist(s)	6	Hannah Cockroft	Great Britain	1:52.79	CR
2nd place, silver medalist(s)	7	Lan Hanyu	China	2:04.99	AS
3rd place, bronze medalist(s)	4	Liu Panpan	China	2:05.69	PB
4	8	Fabienne André	Great Britain	2:05.88	
5	9	Moe Onodera	Japan	2:17.18	SB
6	5	Joyce Lefevre	Belgium	2:17.29	SB
7	3	Ayano Yoshida	Japan	2:26.95	
8	2	Haruka Kitaura	Japan	2:30.16	SB

== T53 ==
The event final took place on 19 May.

Rank	Lane	Name	Nationality	Time	Notes
1st place, gold medalist(s)	7	Zhou Hongzhuan	China	1:56.54	SB
2nd place, silver medalist(s)	5	Gao Fang	China	2:03.14	SB
3rd place, bronze medalist(s)	6	Hamide Doğangün	Turkey	2:10.42	
	8	Greci Gileny Pineda Barajas	Colombia	DNS	

== T54 ==
The event final took place on 19 May.

Rank	Lane	Name	Nationality	Time	Notes
1st place, gold medalist(s)	3	Merle Menje	Germany	1:58.47	
2nd place, silver medalist(s)	7	Zhou Zhaoqian	China	1:58.70	
3rd place, bronze medalist(s)	5	Tian Yajuan	China	1:58.85	
4	2	Momoka Muraoka	Japan	1:58.88	
5	6	Noemi Alphonse	Mauritius	1:59.09	
6	8	Aline Rocha	Brazil	2:01.00	
7	1	Melanie Woods	Great Britain	2:01.83	
8	4	Techinee Duangin	Thailand	2:04.98	
