= Athletics at the 2016 Summer Paralympics – Women's 800 metres T54 =

Women's 800 metres T54 at the XV Paralympic Games
- Venue: Estádio Olímpico João Havelange
- Dates: 17 September 2016
- Competitors: 14 from 10 nations

Medalists
1st place, gold medalist(s)		Tatyana McFadden	United States
2nd place, silver medalist(s)		Wenjun Liu	China
3rd place, bronze medalist(s)		Yingjie Li	China

The T54 category is for wheelchair athletes with no leg function, but near full arm function and reasonable to normal trunk function. Typically this may be caused by a lower spinal cord injury or spinal cord birth defect.

The Athletics at the 2016 Summer Paralympics – Women's 800 metres T54 event at the 2016 Paralympic Games took place on 17 September 2016, at the Estádio Olímpico João Havelange.

== Heats ==
=== Heat 1 ===
10:00 17 September 2016:

Rank	Lane	Bib	Name	Nationality	Reaction	Time	Notes
1	2	906	Tatyana McFadden	United States		1:45.17	Q
2	7	190	Lihong Zou	China		1:49.62	Q
3	6	145	Diane Roy	Canada		1:53.51	Q
4	8	335	Jade Jones	Great Britain		1:53.61	
5	4	47	Jemima Moore	Australia		1:54.37	
6	3	787	Gunilla Wallengren	Sweden		1:54.51	
7	5	625	Hannah Babalola	Nigeria		1:56.17	

=== Heat 2 ===
10:08 17 September 2016:

Rank	Lane	Bib	Name	Nationality	Reaction	Time	Notes
1	3	907	Amanda McGrory	United States		1:47.68	Q
2	2	170	Wenjun Liu	China		1:48.27	Q
3	8	780	Manuela Schaer	Switzerland		1:48.47	Q
4	7	167	Yingjie Li	China		1:48.66	q
5	4	615	Margriet van den Broek	Netherlands		1:49.69	q
6	5	914	Susannah Scaroni	United States		1:56.42	
7	6	850	Zubeyde Supurgeci	Turkey		2:07.63	

== Final ==
17:53 17 September 2016:

Rank	Lane	Bib	Name	Nationality	Reaction	Time	Notes
1st place, gold medalist(s)	3	906	Tatyana McFadden	United States		1:44.73	
2nd place, silver medalist(s)	4	170	Wenjun Liu	China		1:45.02	
3rd place, bronze medalist(s)	8	167	Yingjie Li	China		1:45.23	
4	5	907	Amanda McGrory	United States		1:45.24	
5	6	780	Manuela Schaer	Switzerland		1:46.00	
6	7	190	Lihong Zou	China		1:46.18	
7	1	145	Diane Roy	Canada		1:51.51	
8	2	615	Margriet van den Broek	Netherlands		1:52.01	
