= Athletics at the 2026 Commonwealth Games – Women's 1500 metres (T54) =

Women's 1500 metres (T54) at the 2026 Commonwealth Games
- Venue: Scotstoun Stadium, Glasgow
- Dates: 29 July 2026 (final); 31 July 2026 (re-run)

The women's 1500 metres (T54) event at the 2026 Commonwealth Games, as part of the para-athletics programme, took place at the Scotstoun Stadium on 29 and 31 July 2026.

The event was open to female para-athletes in the T53 and T54 classifications for para-athletes with a lower limb impairment, competing in racing wheelchairs. It was a new event on the Games programme.

== Records ==
Prior to this competition, the existing world record was as follows:

Records T20
World record	3:02.26	Catherine Debrunner (SUI)	31 May 2025	Arbon, Switzerland

== Qualification ==
Para athletic event qualification is regulated by a special system organised between Commonwealth Sport and the International Paralympic Committee. Each para athletic event allowed for eight quota places, or 10 in the case of throwing events. All but one quota in each event was available on the basis of the Commonwealth Para Rankings on 31 Match 2026, to a maximum of two per Commonwealth Games Association (CGA), with the remaining quota allocated by Bipartite invitation.

This list did not set a limit on entrants, as other athletes in the same classification, but qualified directly for another event, could enter the event in question, up to a maximum (combined quota, invitation and 'separate event' quota) of three per event per CGA.

== Schedule ==
The schedule was as follows:

Date	Time	Round
29 July 2026	18:30	Final

All times are United Kingdom time (UTC+1)

== Results ==
=== Final ===
The final of the women's 1500 metres (T54) was scheduled for the evening session of 29 July 2026. Due to an incident involving Canada's Nandina Sharma, several athletes crashed and did not finish the race. Sharma was disqualified from the initial final. The organisers then scheduled a re-run of the final on 31 July 2026.

==== Initial results ====
Place	Athlete	Time	Notes
1st place, gold medalist(s)	Melanie Woods (SCO)	3:33.39	GR, SB
2nd place, silver medalist(s)	Ellis Kottas (ENG)	4:22.07	
3rd place, bronze medalist(s)	Mikaela Dingley (AUS)	4:42.25	SB
4	Joanne Robertson (SCO)	4:47.18	SB
	Noemi Alphonse (MRI)		DNF
	Eliza Ault-Connell (AUS)		DNF
	Nandini Sharma (CAN)		DQ

==== Re-run ====
Nandini Sharma was disqualified from starting this race.

Rank	Athlete	Nation	Time	Notes
1st place, gold medalist(s)	Melanie Woods	Scotland	3:32.20	GR
2nd place, silver medalist(s)	Noemi Alphonse	Mauritius	3:32.98	SB
3rd place, bronze medalist(s)	Eliza Ault-Connell	Australia	3:40.84	SB
4	Ellis Kottas	England	4:03.30	
5	Joanna Robertson	Scotland	4:03.44	SB
6	Mikaela Dingley	Australia	4:41.13	SB
