= Tian Yajuan =

Chinese para athlete (born 1998)

Personal information
- Native name: 田雅娟
- Nationality: Chinese
- Born: 17 November 1998 (age 27)

Sport
- Sport: Para-athletics
- Disability class: T54
Medal record
Women's para-athletics
Representing China
World Championships
Gold medal – first place	2024 Kobe	5000 m T54
Silver medal – second place	2024 Kobe	1500 m T54
Silver medal – second place	2025 New Delhi	5000 m T54
Bronze medal – third place	2024 Kobe	400 m T54
Bronze medal – third place	2024 Kobe	800 m T54

Tian Yajuan (Chinese: 田雅娟; born 17 November 1998) is a Chinese T54 wheelchair racer. She represented China at the 2024 Summer Paralympics.

== Career ==
Tian competed at the 2024 World Para Athletics Championships and won a gold medal in the 5000 metres T54 event with a championship record time of 11:41.76. She also won a silver medal in the 1500 metres T54 event, and bronze medals in the 400 metres T54 and 800 metres T54 events. She then represented China at the 2024 Summer Paralympics. Her best finish was sixth place in the 1500 metres T54 and 5000 metres T54 events. She again competed at the 2025 World Para Athletics Championships and won a silver medal in the 5000 metres T54 event, finishing 1.92 seconds behind gold medalist Catherine Debrunner.
