= Mauritius at the Paralympics =

- IPC code: MRI
- NPC: Mauritius National Paralympic Committee
- Medals: Gold 0 Silver 0 Bronze 1 Total 1

Summer appearances
- 1996; 2000; 2004; 2008; 2012; 2016; 2020; 2024

Mauritius made its Paralympic Games debut at the 1996 Summer Paralympics in Atlanta. It was represented by two male competitors in track and field, Sarwan Custnea and Enrico Cytheree. Absent in 2000, Mauritius returned to the Paralympics in 2004 with two runners, one male (Richard Souci) and one female (Salatchee Murday). The country again had two representatives in 2008: Souci, and male swimmer, Pascal Laperotine.

Yovanni Philippe won Mauritius's first Paralympic medal when he took bronze in the 400 metre, T20 category, at the 2024 Games.

Mauritius has never taken part in the Winter Paralympics.

== List of medalists ==
Medal	Name	Games	Sport	Event
Bronze	Yovanni Philippe	2024 Paris	Athletics	Men's 400m T20

== See also ==
- Mauritius at the Olympics
