= 2024 World Para Athletics Championships – Women's 5000 metres =

The women's 5000 metres at the 2024 World Para Athletics Championships was held in Kobe.

== Medalists ==
Event	Gold	Silver	Bronze
T54	Tian Yajuan; China	Merle Menje; Germany	Aline Rocha; Brazil

== T54 ==
The final took place on 18 May.

Rank	Lane	Name	Nationality	Time	Notes
1st place, gold medalist(s)	3	Tian Yajuan	China	11:41.76	CR
2nd place, silver medalist(s)	1	Merle Menje	Germany	11:41.96	
3rd place, bronze medalist(s)	2	Aline Rocha	Brazil	11:42.32	
