= 2024 World Para Athletics Championships – Women's 400 metres =

The women's 400 metres at the 2024 World Para Athletics Championships were held in Kobe.

== Medalists ==
Event	Gold	Silver	Bronze
T11	Thalita Simplício; Brazil	Liu Cuiqing; China	Lahja Ishitile; Namibia
T12	Hajar Safarzadeh Ghahderijani; Iran	Lorraine Gomes de Aguiar; Brazil	Ketyla Teodooro; Brazil
T13	Lamiya Valiyeva; Azerbaijan	Carolina Duarte; Portugal	Rayane Soares da Silva; Brazil
T20	Deepthi Jeevanji; India	Aysel Önder; Turkey	Lizanshela Angulo; Ecuador
T37	Jiang Fenfen; China	Victoria Slanova; NPA	Liezel Gouws; South Africa
T38	Karen Palomeque; Colombia	Lindy Ave; Germany	Margarita Goncharova; Neutral Paralympic Athletes (NPA)
T47	Fernanda Yara da Silva; Brazil	Lisbeli Vera Andrade; Venezuela	Petra Luteran; Hungary
T53	Zhou Hongzhuan; China	Gao Fang; China	Hamide Doğangün; Turkey
T54	Zhou Zhaoqian; China	Noemi Alphonse; Mauritius	Tian Yajuan; China
