= Athletics at the 2016 Summer Paralympics – Women's 4 × 400 metres relay =

The Women's 4 x 400 metres relay athletics events for the 2016 Summer Paralympics took place at the Estádio Olímpico João Havelange at 08:24 on 16 September 2016. A total of one event was contested over this distance with each leg being run by one of the two different classifications, T53 and T54.

== Results ==
=== T53-54 ===
Rank	Lane	Nation	Competitors	Time	Notes
1st place, gold medalist(s)	5	China	Li Yingjie (T54), Liu Wenjun (T54), Zhou Hongzhuan (T53), Zou Lihong (T54)	3:32.11	
2nd place, silver medalist(s)	1	Australia	Angela Ballard (T53), Madison de Rozario (T53), Jemima Moore (T54), Christie Dawes (T54)	3:46.63	
3	7	Turkey	Hamide Kurt (T53), Zeynep Acet (T53), Zubeyde Supurgeci (T54), Nursah Usta (T53)	DSQ	
4	3	United States	Hannah McFadden (T54), Chelsea McClammer (T53), Cheri Madsen (T54), Tatyana McFadden (T54)	DSQ	
