= 2024 World Para Athletics Championships – Women's 1500 metres =

The women's 1500 metres at the 2024 World Para Athletics Championships were held in Kobe.

== Medalists ==
Event	Gold	Silver	Bronze
T11	Yayesh Gate Tesfaw; Ethiopia	He Shanshan; China	Louzanne Coetzee; South Africa
T13	Tigist Mengistu; Ethiopia	Fatima Ezzahra El Idrissi; Morocco	Somaya Bousaid; Tunisia
T20	Barbara Bieganowska-Zając; Poland	Antônia Keyla; Brazil	Ilona Biacsi; Hungary
T54	Zhou Zhaoqian; China	Tian Yajuan; China	Merle Menje; Germany

== T13 ==
The event final took place on 18 May.

Rank	Lane	Name	Nationality	Time	Notes
1st place, gold medalist(s)	1	Tigist Mengistu	Ethiopia	4:18.90	CR
2nd place, silver medalist(s)	5	Fatima Ezzahra El Idrissi	Morocco	4:24.58	CR
3rd place, bronze medalist(s)	4	Somaya Bousaid	Tunisia	4:34.74	SB
4	3	Peace Oroma	Uganda	4:40.78	SB
5	2	Francy Osorio	Colombia	4:45.03	SB
