= Li Yingjie =

Chinese Paralympic athlete (born 1988)

Personal information
- Native name: 李英杰
- Born: February 26, 1988 (age 38)

Sport
- Country: China
- Sport: Track and field
Medal record
Women's para athletics
Representing China
Paralympic Games
Gold medal – first place	2016 Rio de Janeiro	4×400 m relay
Bronze medal – third place	2016 Rio de Janeiro	100 m T54
Bronze medal – third place	2016 Rio de Janeiro	800 m T54
Asian Para Games
Silver medal – second place	2010 Guangzhou	200m T54

Li Yingjie( Chinese: 李英杰) (born 26 February 1988) is a Chinese Paralympic athlete. In 2016, she won a bronze medal in the women's 800 metres T54 event at the 2016 Summer Paralympics held in Rio de Janeiro, Brazil. She also won the bronze medal in the women's 100 metres T54 event.
