= Mauritius at the 2008 Summer Paralympics =

- IPC code: MRI
- NPC: Mauritius National Paralympic Committee

in Beijing
- Competitors: 2 in 2 sports
- Flag bearers: Richard Souci (opening & closing)
- Medals: Gold 0 Silver 0 Bronze 0 Total 0

Summer Paralympics appearances (overview)
- 1996; 2000; 2004; 2008; 2012; 2016; 2020; 2024

Mauritius sent a delegation to compete at the 2008 Summer Paralympics in Beijing, People's Republic of China. Two athletes represented the country in athletics and swimming.

== Athletics ==
Men

Athlete	Class	Event	Heats		Semifinal		Final		
Athlete	Class	Event	Result	Rank	Result	Rank	Result	Points	Rank
Richard Souci	T12	100 m	12.64	4	did not advance				
Richard Souci	T12	200 m	25.30	3	did not advance				

== Swimming ==
Men

Athlete	Class	Event	Heats		Final	
Athlete	Class	Event	Result	Rank	Result	Rank
Pascal Laperotine	S9	50 m freestyle	36.39	21	did not advance	

== See also ==
- Mauritius at the Paralympics
- Mauritius at the 2008 Summer Olympics
