= Liu Wenjun =

Chinese Paralympic athlete

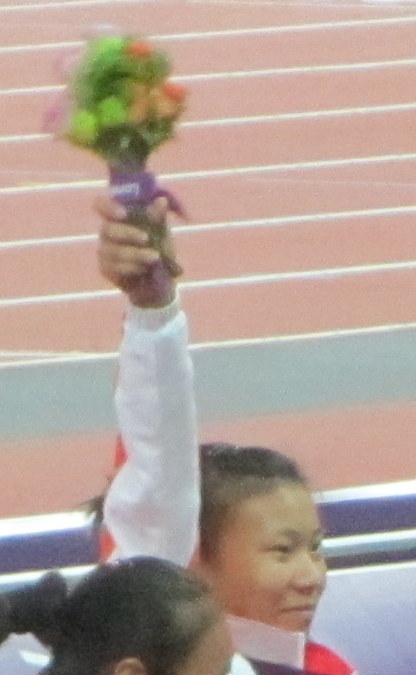
- Gold in London 2012

Personal information
- Native name: 刘文君
- Born: 5 May 1985 (age 41)

Sport
- Country: China
- Sport: Track and field
- Event(s): sprint, middle-distance races
Medal record
Women's para athletics
Representing China
Paralympic Games
Gold medal – first place	2008 Beijing	4 × 100 m T53/54
Gold medal – first place	2012 London	100m T54
Gold medal – first place	2016 Rio de Janeiro	100m T54
Gold medal – first place	2016 Rio de Janeiro	4 × 100 m T53/54
Silver medal – second place	2008 Beijing	100m T54
Silver medal – second place	2016 Rio de Janeiro	800m T54
World Championships
Gold medal – first place	2015 Doha	100m T54
Gold medal – first place	2015 Doha	400m T54
Gold medal – first place	2015 Doha	4X400m relay T53–54
Silver medal – second place	2015 Doha	800m T54
Asian Para Games
Gold medal – first place	2014 Incheon	400m T54
Gold medal – first place	2014 Incheon	800m T54
Silver medal – second place	2010 Guangzhou	100m T54
Silver medal – second place	2014 Incheon	1500m T54

Liu Wenjun( Chinese: 刘文君) (born 5 May 1985) is a Paralympian athlete from China competing mainly in category T54 wheelchair sprint and middle-distance events.

Liu competed in the 2008 Summer Paralympics in Beijing, China. There she won a gold medal in the women's 4 × 100 metre relay T53/54, a silver medal in the women's 100 m T54, finished seventh in the women's 800 m T54 and finished sixth in the women's Marathon T54. Four years later she won gold again, winning the 100m sprint at the 2012 Summer Paralympics in London.

Wenjun took two gold medals in the 100m T54 and 4 × 100 m relay T53/54 at the 2016 Summer Paralympics in Rio.
