= Mauritius at the 2012 Summer Paralympics =

- IPC code: MRI
- NPC: Mauritius National Paralympic Committee

in London
- Competitors: 2 in 2 sports
- Medals: Gold 0 Silver 0 Bronze 0 Total 0

Summer Paralympics appearances (overview)
- 1996; 2000; 2004; 2008; 2012; 2016; 2020; 2024

Mauritius competed at the 2012 Summer Paralympics in London, United Kingdom from August 29 to September 9, 2012.

== Athletics ==
Women’s track

Athlete	Event	Heat		Final	
Athlete	Event	Result	Rank	Result	Rank
Patricia Mustapha	800m T54	DSQ		Did not advance	

== Swimming ==
Men

Athletes	Event	Heat		Final	
Athletes	Event	Time	Rank	Time	Rank
Scody Victor	50m freestyle S9	34.26	15	Did not advance	

== See also ==
- Mauritius at the Paralympics
- Mauritius at the 2012 Summer Olympics
