= Athletics at the 2024 Summer Paralympics – Men's 400 metres T20 =

Men's 400 metres T20 at the XVII Paralympic Games
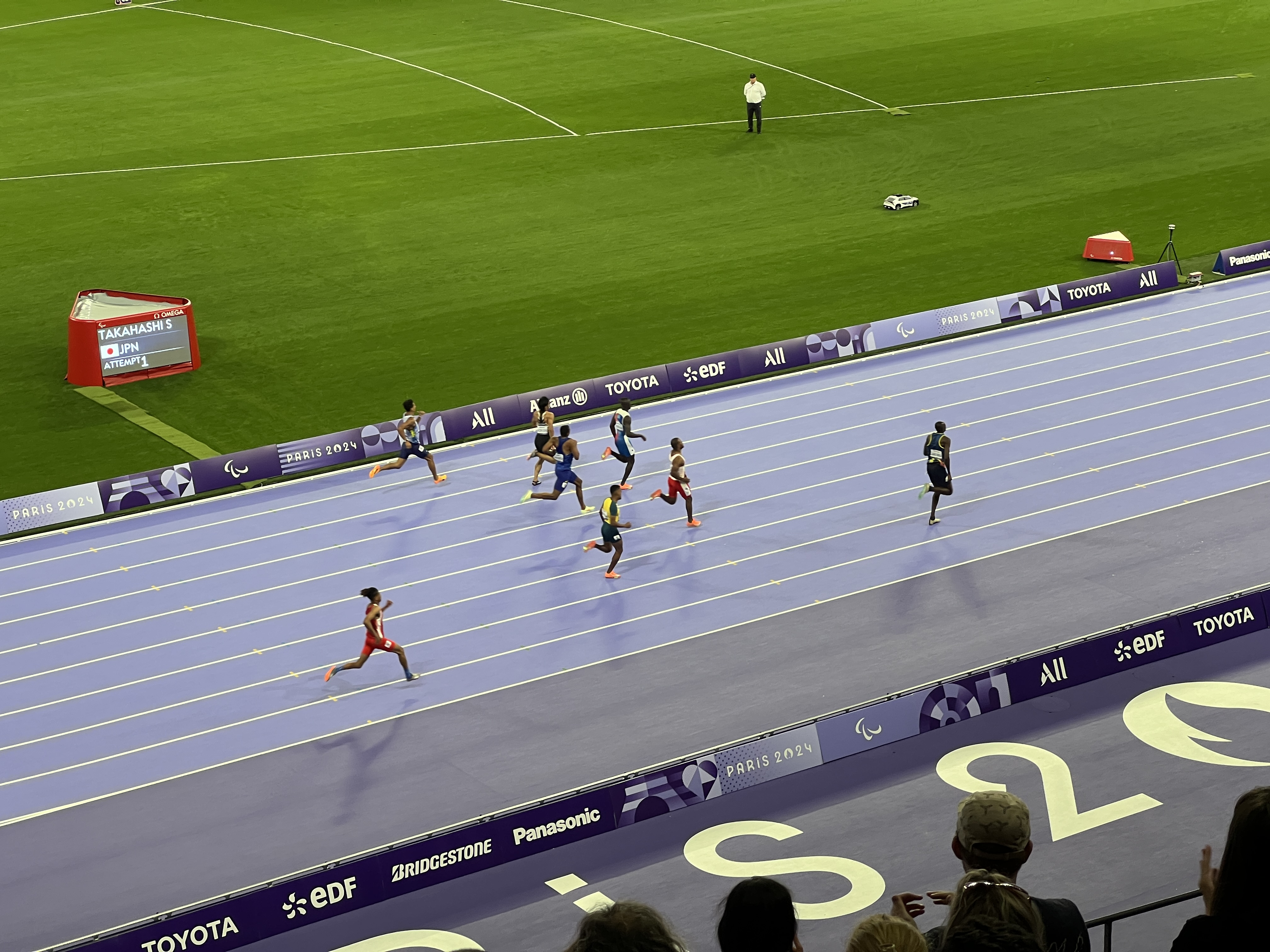
- The final before the finish.
- Venue: Stade de France, Paris, France
- Dates: 3 September 2024
- Competitors: 8 from 7 nations
- Winning time: 48.59

Medalists
1st place, gold medalist(s)		Jhon Obando	Colombia
2nd place, silver medalist(s)		David José Pineda Mejía	Spain
3rd place, bronze medalist(s)		Yovanni Philippe	Mauritius

400 metres at the 2024 Summer Paralympics
Men · T11 · T12 · T13 · T20 · T36 · T37 · T38 · T47 · T52 · T53 · T54 · T62
Women · T11 · T12 · T13 · T20 · T37 · T38 · T47 · T53 · T54 ·

The Men's 400 metres T20 at the 2024 Summer Paralympics took place on 3 September 2024 at the Stade de France in Paris.

== Records ==
World record	Samuel Conceição (BRA)	46.48	(Chile) Santiago	24 November 2023
Paralympic record	Daniel Tavares Martins (BRA)	47.22	(Brazil) Rio de Janeiro	9 September 2016

Area	Time	Athlete	Location	Date
Africa				
America				
Asia				
Europe				
Oceania				

== Classification ==
The T20 category is for athletes with intellectual impairment. T20 athletes have an IQ score of 75 or less.

== Results ==
=== Final ===
The T20 event was a straight final with eight entrants. The final in this classification took place on 3 September 2024, at 20:36:

Rank	Lane	Name	Nationality	Time	Notes
1st place, gold medalist(s)	8	Jhon Obando	Colombia	48.09	
2nd place, silver medalist(s)	6	David José Pineda Mejía	Spain	48.24	
3rd place, bronze medalist(s)	9	Yovanni Philippe	Mauritius	48.30	
4	3	Muhammad Ammar Aiman Nor Azmi	Malaysia	48.38	
5	5	Samuel Oliveira Conceição	Brazil	48.59	
6	2	Luis Felipe Rodríguez Bolívar	Venezuela	48.72	
7	7	Daniel Tavares Martins	Brazil	48.91	
8	4	Charles-Antoine Kouakou	France	49.04	
