= Mauritius at the 2004 Summer Paralympics =

- IPC code: MRI
- NPC: Mauritius National Paralympic Committee

in Athens
- Competitors: 2 in 1 sport
- Flag bearer: Salatchee Murday
- Medals: Gold 0 Silver 0 Bronze 0 Total 0

Summer Paralympics appearances (overview)
- 1996; 2000; 2004; 2008; 2012; 2016; 2020; 2024

Mauritius competed at the 2004 Summer Paralympics in Athens, Greece. The team included 2 athletes, 1 man and 1 woman, but won no medals.

== Sports ==
=== Athletics ===
==== Men's track ====
Athlete	Class	Event	Heats		Semifinal		Final	
Athlete	Class	Event	Result	Rank	Result	Rank	Result	Rank
Richard Souci	T12	100m	12.51	4	did not advance			
Richard Souci	T12	200m	24.80	4	did not advance			

==== Women's track ====
Athlete	Class	Event	Heats		Semifinal		Final	
Athlete	Class	Event	Result	Rank	Result	Rank	Result	Rank
Salatchee Murday	T54	200m	44.40	6	did not advance			

== See also ==
- Mauritius at the Paralympics
- Mauritius at the 2004 Summer Olympics
