= Merle Menje =

German Para athlete and cross-country skier (born 2004)

Personal information
- Full name: Merle Marie Menje
- Nicknames: Wunderkind (German: Wonder Child)
- Born: 19 August 2004 (age 22) Mainz, Germany

Sport
- Country: Germany
- Sport: Para athletics Para cross-country skiing
- Disability: Spina bifida
- Disability class: T54
Medal record
Para-athletics
Representing Germany
World Championships
Gold medal – first place	2024 Kobe	800m T54
Silver medal – second place	2024 Kobe	5000m T54
Bronze medal – third place	2024 Kobe	1500m T54
European Championships
Gold medal – first place	2021 Bydgoszcz	400m T54
Gold medal – first place	2021 Bydgoszcz	5000m T54
Silver medal – second place	2021 Bydgoszcz	100m T54
Silver medal – second place	2021 Bydgoszcz	800m T54

Merle Marie Menje (born 19 August 2004) is a German Para athlete and cross-country skier who competes in international elite competitions. She is a two-time European champion and was selected to compete at the 2020 Summer Paralympics.
