= Mauritius at the 2020 Summer Paralympics =

- IPC code: MRI
- NPC: Mauritius National Paralympic Committee

in Tokyo
- Competitors: 5 in 1 sport
- Medals: Gold 0 Silver 0 Bronze 0 Total 0

Summer Paralympics appearances (overview)
- 1996; 2000; 2004; 2008; 2012; 2016; 2020; 2024

Mauritius competed at the 2020 Summer Paralympics in Tokyo, Japan, from 24 August to 5 September 2021.

== Athletics ==
Track

Athlete	Event	Heats		Final	
Athlete	Event	Result	Rank	Result	Rank
Anais Angeline	Women's 100 m T37				
Anais Angeline	Women's 200 m T37				
Marie Alphonse	Women's 100 m T54				
Marie Alphonse	Women's 400 m T54				
Marie Alphonse	Women's 800 m T54				
Marie Alphonse	Women's 1500 m T54				
Marie Perrine	Women's 100 m T54				
Marie Perrine	Women's 400 m T54				
Marie Perrine	Women's 800 m T54				

Field

Athlete	Event	Heats		Final	
Athlete	Event	Result	Rank	Result	Rank
Eddy Capdor	Men's long jump T20				
Anais Angeline	Women's long jump T37				

== See also ==
- Mauritius at the 2020 Summer Olympics
