= Zhou Zhaoqian =

Chinese Paralympic athlete (born 1997)

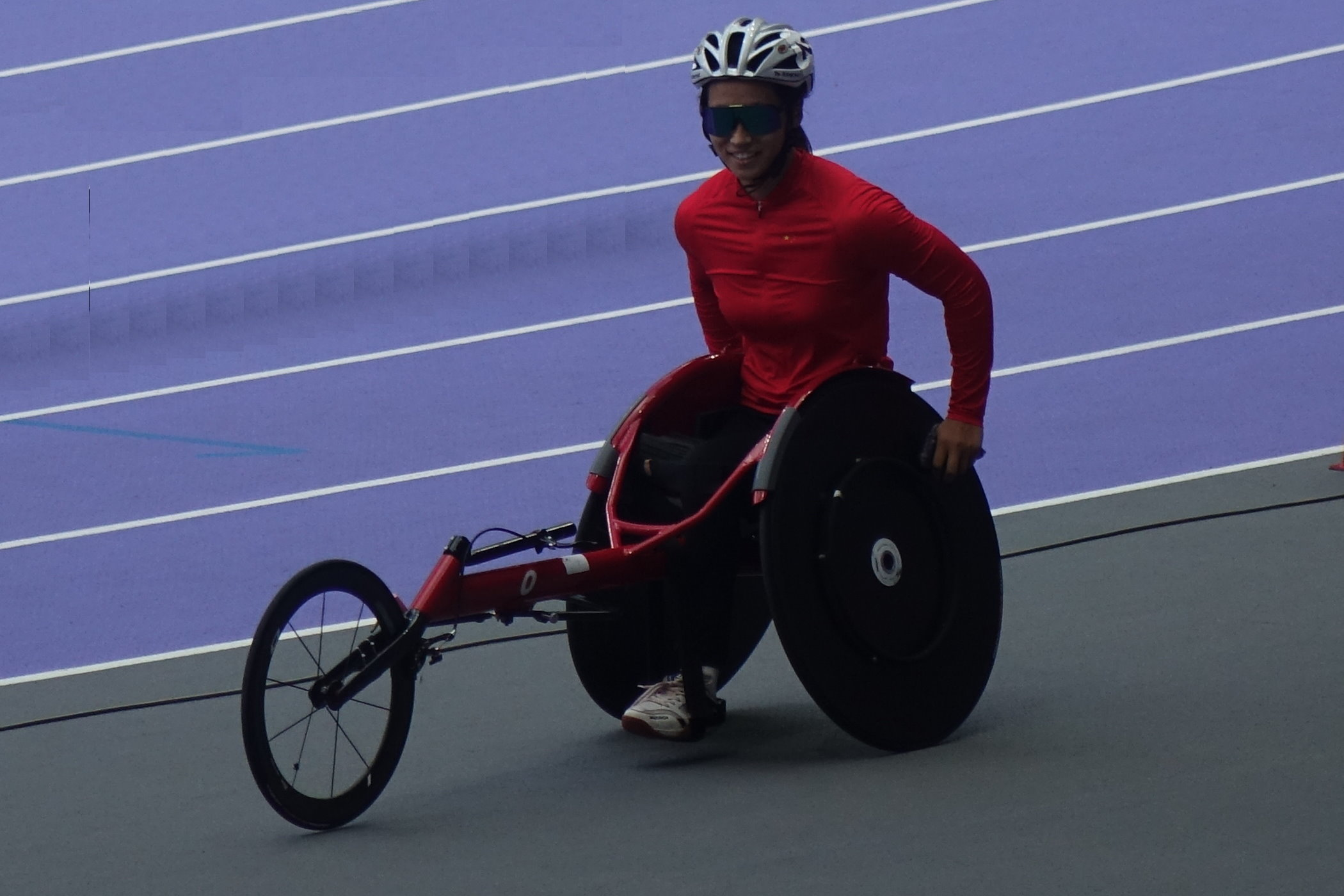
- Zhaoqian at the 2024 Summer Paralympics

Personal information
- Native name: 周召倩
- Born: 11 October 1997 (age 29)

Sport
- Country: China
- Sport: Para-athletics
- Disability class: T54
- Events: 100 metres 200 metres 1500 metres Marathon
Medal record
Women's para athletics
Representing China
Paralympic Games
Gold medal – first place	2020 Tokyo	100 m T54
Gold medal – first place	2020 Tokyo	1500 m T54
Silver medal – second place	2024 Paris	800 m T54
Bronze medal – third place	2020 Tokyo	400 m T54
Bronze medal – third place	2024 Paris	400 m T54
World Championships
Gold medal – first place	2024 Kobe	400 m T54
Gold medal – first place	2024 Kobe	1500 m T54
Silver medal – second place	2019 Dubai	100 m T54
Silver medal – second place	2023 Paris	800 m T54
Silver medal – second place	2024 Kobe	800 m T54
Silver medal – second place	2024 Kobe	100 m T54
Silver medal – second place	2024 Kobe	800 m T54
Silver medal – second place	2025 New Delhi	400 m T54
Silver medal – second place	2025 New Delhi	800 m T54
Silver medal – second place	2025 New Delhi	1500 m T54
Bronze medal – third place	2023 Paris	1500 m T54
Bronze medal – third place	2025 New Delhi	100 m T54
Asian Para Games
Gold medal – first place	2018 Jakarta	100 m T54
Gold medal – first place	2018 Jakarta	200 m T54
Gold medal – first place	2022 Hangzhou	1500m T54
Silver medal – second place	2018 Jakarta	400 m T54

Zhou Zhaoqian ( Chinese: 周召倩)(born 11 October 1997) is a Chinese Paralympic athlete competing to the T54 category.

== Career ==
Having been injured in a car accident at the age of five, which saw doctors forced to amputate her right leg, Zhou started practicing para-athletics in 2012. In 2018, she wore the shirt of the Chinese national team for the first time at the 2018 Asian Para Games in Jakarta, where she won two gold medals in the 100 and 200 meters and the silver medal in the 400 meters.

At the 2019 World Para Athletics Championships, Zhou finished second in the 100 meters, while she reached the fourth and seventh position in the 400 and 1500 meters respectively. In 2021, she took part in the 2020 Summer Paralympics, where she won the gold medal in the 100 and 1500 meters and won the bronze medal in the 400 meters.
