= Jemima Moore =

Australian Paralympic athlete

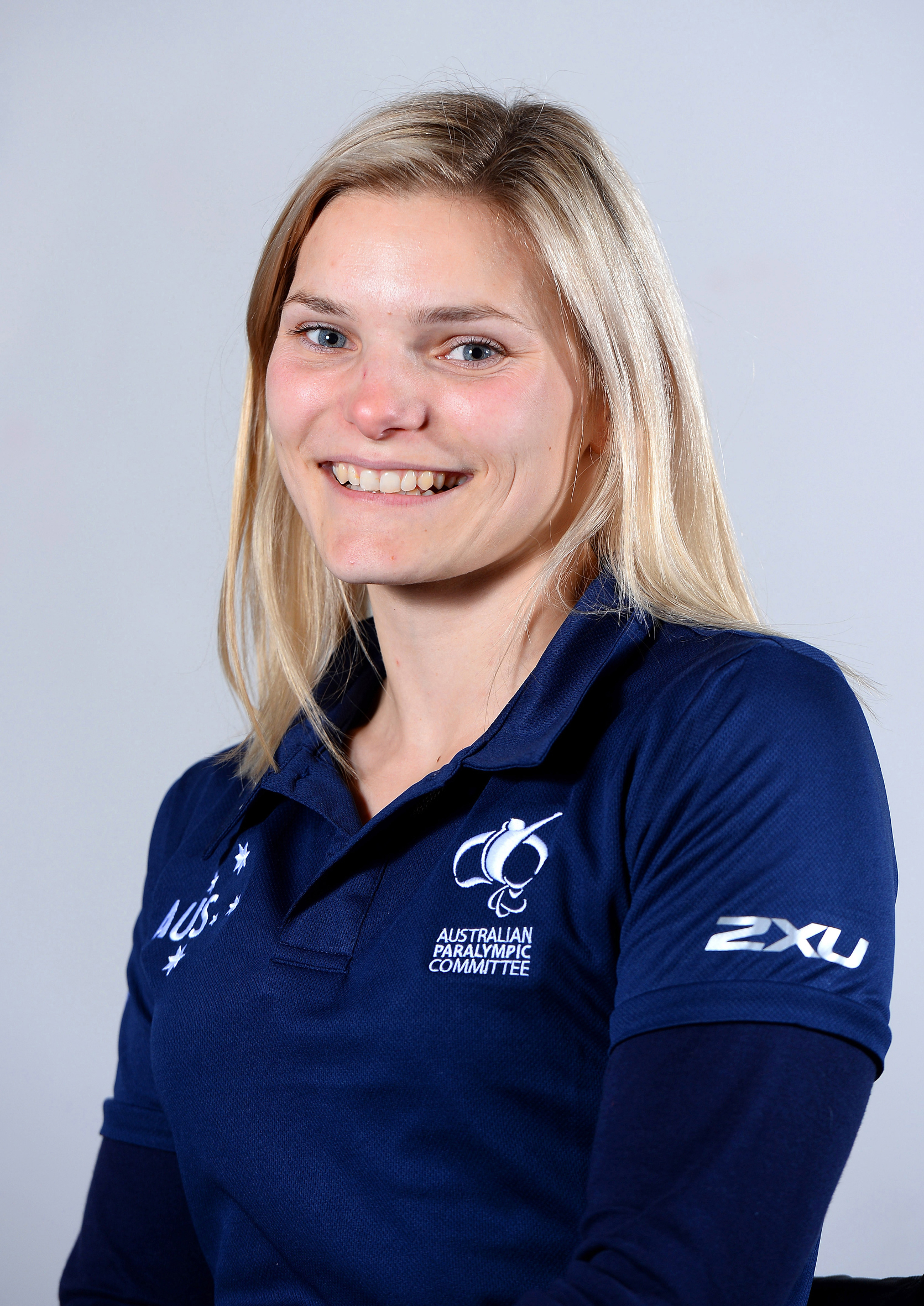
- 2016 Australian Paralympic team portrait

Personal information
- Born: 18 March 1992 (age 34) Geelong
Medal record
Paralympic athletics
Representing Australia
Paralympic Games
Silver medal – second place	2016 Rio	Women's 4×400 metre relay – T53/54
Silver medal – second place	2008 Beijing	4 x 100 metres relay – T53-54

Jemima Moore (born 18 March 1992) is a Paralympian athlete from Australia competing mainly in category T53-54 4 x 100 metres relay events. She represented Australia at the 2008 Beijing and 2016 Rio Paralympics.

== Personal ==
She was born in Geelong, Victoria. At the age of six, she collapsed due to a rare spinal virus and this affected her lower back and caused her long term incomplete paraplegia.

== Athletics ==
She competed in the 2008 Summer Paralympics in Beijing, China. There she won a silver medal in the women's T53-54 4 x 100 metres relay event. She also competed in the individual 100m for T54 athletes but finished third in her heat and failed to progress to the final.

Moore also competed in the 2016 Rio Paralympics where she won a silver medal in the Women's 4 × 400 m T53-54 relay. She finished 11th in the Women's T54 100 m and 400 m and 10th in the Women's 800 m.

At the 2017 World Para Athletics Championships in London, England, she finished 10th in the Women's 400m T54, 800m T53 and 1500m T54 events. Moore was one of three Geelong Para Athletes, as well as Martin Jackson and Sam McIntosh, to be selected for the Championships.
