= Yovanni Philippe =

Mauritian Paralympic athlete (born 2002)

Personal information
- Nationality: Mauritian
- Born: 2 May 2002 (age 24)

Sport
- Sport: Para-athletics
- Disability class: T20
- Event: 400 metres
Medal record
Para-athletics
Representing Mauritius
Paralympic Games
Bronze medal – third place	2024 Paris	400 m T20
World Championships
Bronze medal – third place	2023 Paris	400 m T20

Yovanni Philippe (born 2 May 2002) is a Mauritian T20 Paralympic sprint runner. He competed at the 2024 Summer Paralympics, and won the first Paralympic Games medal for Mauritius.

== Career ==
Philippe represented Mauritius at the 2023 World Para Athletics Championships and won a bronze medal in the 400 metre T20 event.

Philippe represented Mauritius at the 2024 Summer Paralympics and won a bronze medal in the 400 metres T20 event, the first-ever medal for Mauritius at the Paralympics.
