= Noemi Alphonse =

Mauritian Paralympic athlete

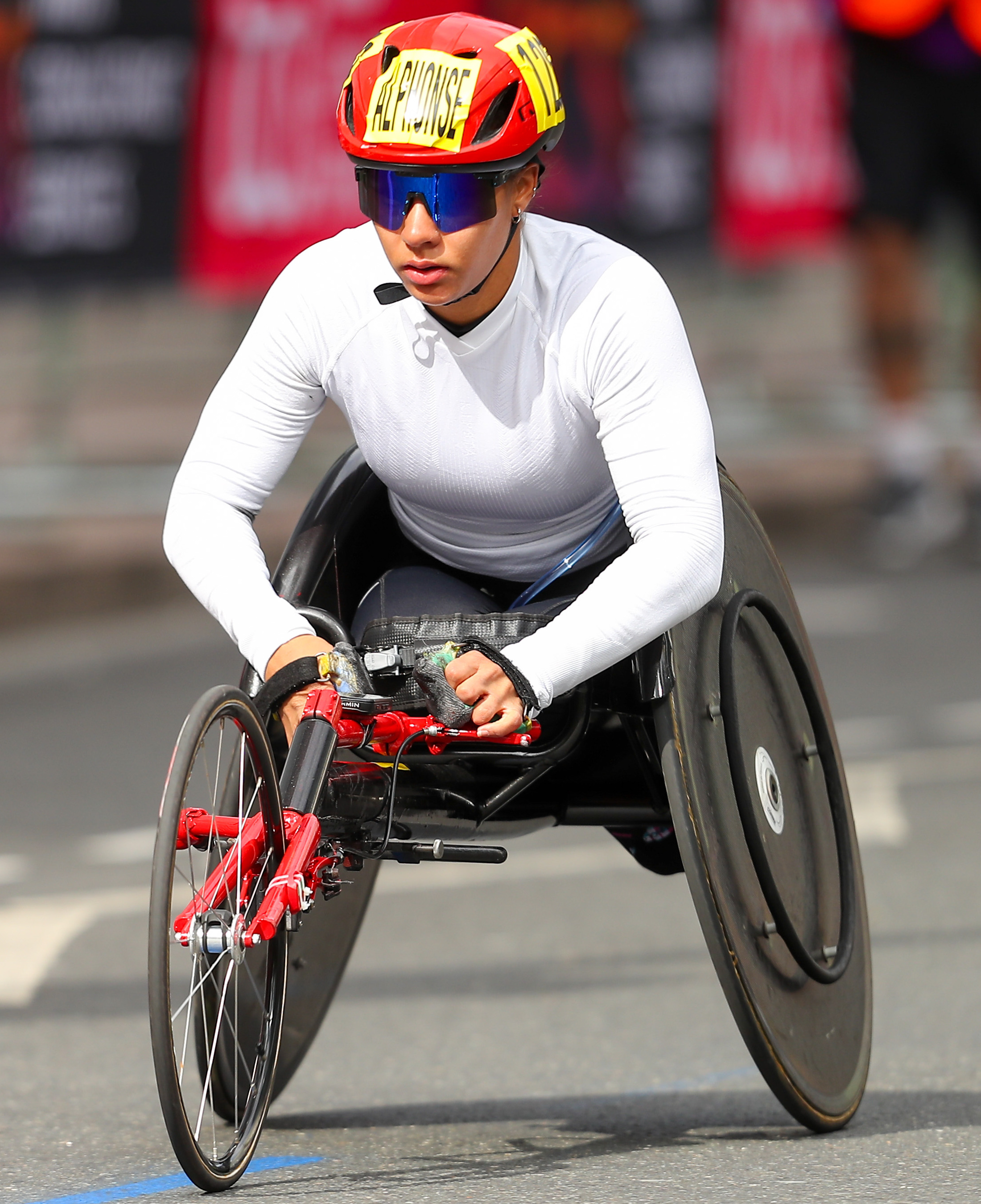
- Alphonse in 2024

Personal information
- Full name: Marie Emmanuelle Anais Alphonse
- National team: Mauritius
- Born: 23 November 1995 (age 30)

Sport
- Country: Mauritius
- Sport: Paralympic athletics
- Disability class: T54
- Events: 100 metres 200 metres 400 metres 800 metres 1500 metres 5000 metres
- Coached by: Jean-Marie Bhugeerathee

Achievements and titles
- Personal bests: 100 m T54: 15.95 AR (Arbon, 2023); 400 m T54: 53.52 AR (Paris, 2023); 800 m T54: 1:45.29 AR (Nottwil, 2023); 1500 m T54: 3:21.45 AR (Sharjah, 2023); 5000 m T54: 11:24.94 AR (Arbon, 2023)
Medal record
Women's para-athletics
Representing Mauritius
World Championships
Gold medal – first place	2024 Kobe	100 m T54
Gold medal – first place	2025 New Delhi	100 m T54
Silver medal – second place	2023 Paris	100 m T54
Silver medal – second place	2024 Kobe	400 m T54
Bronze medal – third place	2023 Paris	400 m T54
Commonwealth Games
Silver medal – second place	2026 Glasgow	1500 m T54

Marie Emmanuelle Anais Alphonse (born 23 November 1995), better known as Noemi Alphonse, is a Mauritian Paralympic athlete competing in the T54 classifiaction. Alphonse represented Mauritius at multiple World Para Athletics Championships and the 2020 and 2024 Summer Paralympics.

== Early life and education ==
Alphonse is from Sainte-Croix, Mauritius and was born in 1995 with a limb deficiency. She was fitted for her first prosthetic at eight years old. She attended Père Laval R.C.A School, Lorette College, and Université de Maurice.

== Career ==
Alphonse represented Mauritius at the 2020 Summer Paralympics, competing in the women's T54 100 m, 400 m, 800 m, and 1500 m. She was the first Mauritian athlete to participate in a final at the Paralympic Games and set a new African record in the T54 1500 m. She placed fifth in the 100 m, sixth in the 400 m, seventh in the 800 m, and tenth in the 1500 m.

At the 2023 World Para Athletics Championships, Alphonse won silver in the women's 100 m T54, Mauritius' first ever medal at a World Para Athletics Championships. She also placed third in the women's 400 m T54. Alphonse won gold in women's 100 m T54 at the 2024 World Para Athletics Championships, which was Mauritius' first gold medal at a World Para Athletics Championships. She also placed fifth in the women's 800 m T54, seventh in the women's 1500 m T54, and won a silver medal in women's 400 m T54.

Alphonse competed in the women's T54 100 m, 400 m, 800 m, and marathon at the 2024 Summer Paralympics and was a flag-bearer for Mauritius. She placed fourth in the T54 100 m. She placed second in the 2024 Sanlam Cape Town Marathon

At the Glasgow 2026 Commonwealth Games, she won the silver medal in the 1500m T54 category, in a re‑run of the original final that was ordered following a collision in the first running of the event, which had left Alphonse unable to finish the race.
