= Mel Woods =

Scottish wheelchair racer (born 1994)

Personal information
- Born: Melanie Woods; 12 August 1994 (age 31) United Kingdom
- Occupations: Teacher, athlete
- Website: melaniewoods.org

Sport
- Sport: Para-athletics
- Disability class: T54
- Event: 800 metres
Medal record
Women's para athletics
Representing Great Britain
World Championships
Bronze medal – third place	2025 New Delhi	800 m T54
Bronze medal – third place	2025 New Delhi	1500 m T54
Representing Scotland
Commonwealth Games
Gold medal – first place	2026 Glasgow	1500 m T54
Gold medal – first place	2026 Glasgow	400 m T54

Melanie Woods (born 12 August 1994) is a Scottish teacher and wheelchair racer who competed at the postponed 2020 Summer Paralympics in Tokyo and the 2026 Commonwealth Games in Glasgow.

== Life ==
Woods was born in 1994 and she was interested in cycling, the gym and horse riding. She came to notice after an accident in 2018. She was working as a PE teacher in Glasgow and while she was out on her bike in Inverness a car drove into her. When the ambulance arrived she was face down and she said she knew that her lower body was out of her control. Her pelvis and back was broken and one leg was broken three times and without its skin.

Woods was paralysed below the waist. She spent her recovery in the spinal unit of Queen Elizabeth University Hospital in Glasgow. During her recovery she watched the paralympics and she decided that she would try to compete. She found the paralympians dedication an inspiration and a motivation. She tried wheelchair tennis and swimming and even travelled abroad to ski, but it was wheelchair racing that she took as her sport. She joined the Red Star Athletics Club in Glasgow where she trains everyday with her own coach and with Sammi Kinghorn as a training partner.

== Career ==
She competed at the Inter-Spinal Unit Games in 2019 and then with the aid of charity she bought her own racing wheelchair and very light carbon fibre wheels.

Woods went to Poland to compete at the 2021 World Para Athletics European Championships. Fellow Scots took four golds and Woods competed over four days in four events. It was her first competition as a senior and she came fifth in the final of the women's 800m T54. At the end of June she was in Manchester for the British Athletic Championships where she was third in a mixed classification 400m wheelchair race behind Hannah Cockroft and Sammi Kinghorn. She was among nine Scottish athletes who were chosen to compete at the postponed 2020 Summer Paralympics. She and most of the names were announced in July 2021. The others were Samantha Kinghorn, Libby Clegg, Jo Butterfield, Maria Lyle, Owen Miller, Derek Rae, Stef Reid and Ben Rowlings. For her and Owen Miller it would be their first paralympics, but for others like Libby Clegg this was her fourth. She is coached by Rodger Harkins who was Scottish Athletics Performance Director in 2018.

She was pleased with her fifth place in the T54 800m in Tokyo as she had only recently returned to the sport. She took two seconds off her time in the Paralympic heats to get a personal best time of 1:50.40.

At the 2022 Commonwealth Games, she came 4th in the 1500m T53/54.

At the 2023 World Para Athletics Championships, she came 10th in the 400m T54.

At the 2024 World Para Athletics Championships, Melanie came 4th in both the 400m and 1500m and 7th in the 800m T54.

Woods was selected to compete at the 2024 Summer Paralympics, held in Paris, France. She came 6th in the T54 800m and 8th in the T54 1500m.

At the Glasgow 2026 Commonwealth Games, she won the gold medal in both the 400m and 1500m T54 categories for Scotland, with the 1500m victory confirmed after she won both the initial race and a re‑run that was ordered following a collision behind her in the first running of the event.
