= Eliza Stankovic-Mowle =

Australian wheelchair racer (born 1981)

Stankovic-Mowle
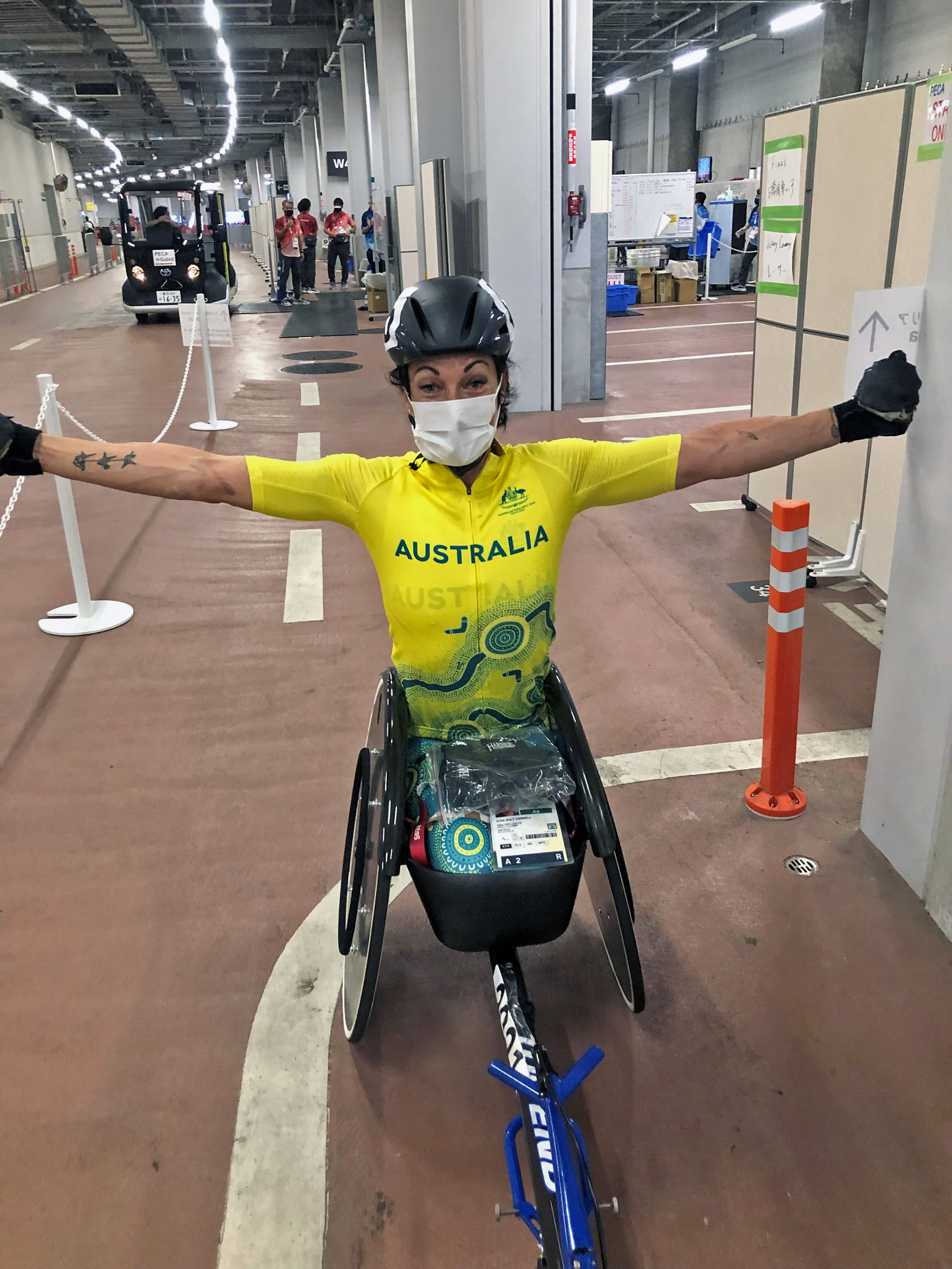
- After completing her track program at the Tokyo 2020 Paralympic Games

Personal information
- Nationality: Australia
- Born: 19 September 1981 (age 45) Sydney, New South Wales
Medal record
Women's athletics
Representing Australia
World Para Athletics Championships
Silver medal – second place	2002 Lille	400m T54
Bronze medal – third place	2006 Assen	800m T54
Bronze medal – third place	2019 Dubai	800m T54
Commonwealth Games
Silver medal – second place	2006 Melbourne	800m T54
Silver medal – second place	2018 Gold Coast	Marathon T54
Bronze medal – third place	2002 Victoria	800m Wheelchair
Olympic Games (demonstration sport)
2nd	2004 Athens	Wheelchair racing

Eliza Stankovic-Mowle AM (née Ault-Connell; born 19 September 1981) is an Australian wheelchair racer, who competed at Paralympic and Olympic Games. She survived meningococcal disease and plays a major role in improving the Australian community's awareness of the disease.

== Early life ==
Eliza Jane Ault-Connell was born in Sydney, New South Wales, on 19 September 1981. In 1997, at the age of 16, she nearly died from meningococcal disease. She had both her legs amputated above the knees two days after contracting the disease. She said "Amputation wasn't a decision I had to make: I was in a coma at the time. Mum and Dad were told that's what had to be done to save my life, so in that sense there was no choice." Later she had to make the decision to have most of the fingers on each hand removed. She was in hospital for six months and in 1998, she acquired prosthetic legs.

She is the Director of Meningococcal Australia and is involved in promoting the awareness of meningococcal disease in the Australian community.

In 2022, she was part of the Australian Institute of Sport (AIS) Accelerate program that is designed to increase the number and visibility of women in sport leadership positions. She is an Ambassador for Wheelchair Sports NSW/ACT.

== Athletics career ==
Before her illness, Stankovic excelled in netball and basketball. In 1998, she started running using her prosthetic legs and was classed T44 athlete. However, she moved to wheelchair racing as a T54 athlete due to a problem with the bone in the stump. During her athletics, she competed as Eliza Ault-Connell.

Ault-Connell's first major international competition was 2002 Commonwealth Games where she won the bronze medal in the Women's Wheelchair 800m. At the 2002 IPC Athletics World Championships, she competed in three events and won a silver medal in the Women's 400m T54 event. At the 2004 Olympic Games, she finished second in the demonstration sport of Women's 1500 m wheelchair and the Women's 800 m wheelchair. She also participated in the 2004 Summer Paralympics. At the 2004 Athens Paralympics, she competed in five events and did not medal. Ault-Connell won three consecutive Oz Day 10K Wheelchair Road Race from 2004 to 2006. She won a bronze medal in the Women's 800m T54 at the 2006 Commonwealth Games in Melbourne. At the 2006 IPC Athletics World Championships, she competed in three events and won a bronze medal in the Women's 800m T54.

At the 2019 London Marathon which was also the 2019 World Para Athletics Championships marathon event, she finished fourth in the Women's T46. At 2019 World Para Athletics Championships in Dubai, she won the bronze medal in the Women's 800m T54.

She was made a Member of the Order of Australia in the 2019 Queen's Birthday Honours "for significant service to community health, and as a Paralympic athlete."

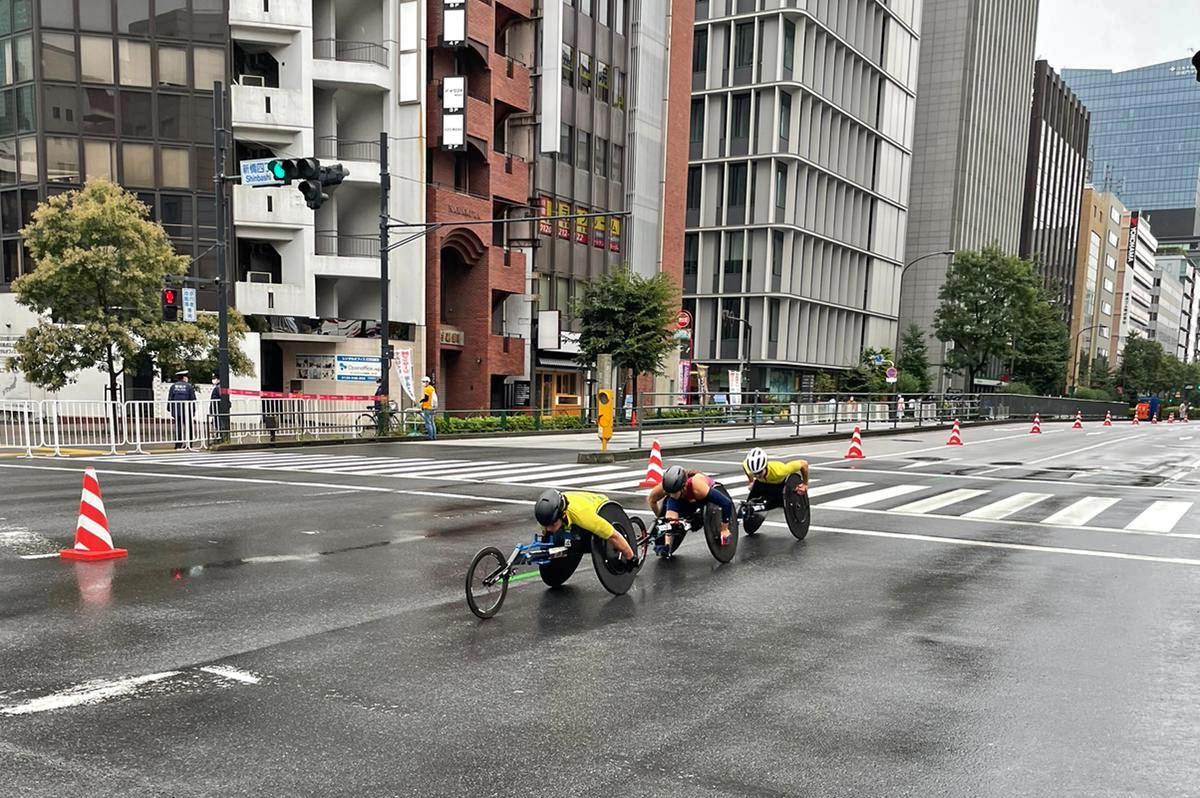
Australian athletes Christe Dawes and Eliza Ault-Connell on the marathon course at the Tokyo 2020 Paralympic Games

She at the 2020 Tokyo Summer Paralympics, her second Summer Paralympics, In the T54 events she qualified for the finals and came 8th in the 100m and 7th in the 400m. and 13th in the Marathon. She announced her retirement from competitive athletics in August 2022.

== Family ==
Stankovic was previously married to gold medal-winning Australian Paralympic athlete Kieran Ault-Connell and they have two daughters and a son. She also has two step daughters.

== Recognition ==
- NSWIS Ian Thorpe Grand Slam International Outstanding Achievement Award
- 2002 Australian Junior Paralympian of the Year
- 2003 Newcastle Young Citizen of the Year
- 2007 Victorian State Finalist Young Australian of the Year 2007
- 2019 Member of the Order of Australia
