= Hannah Dederick =

American Paralympic athlete

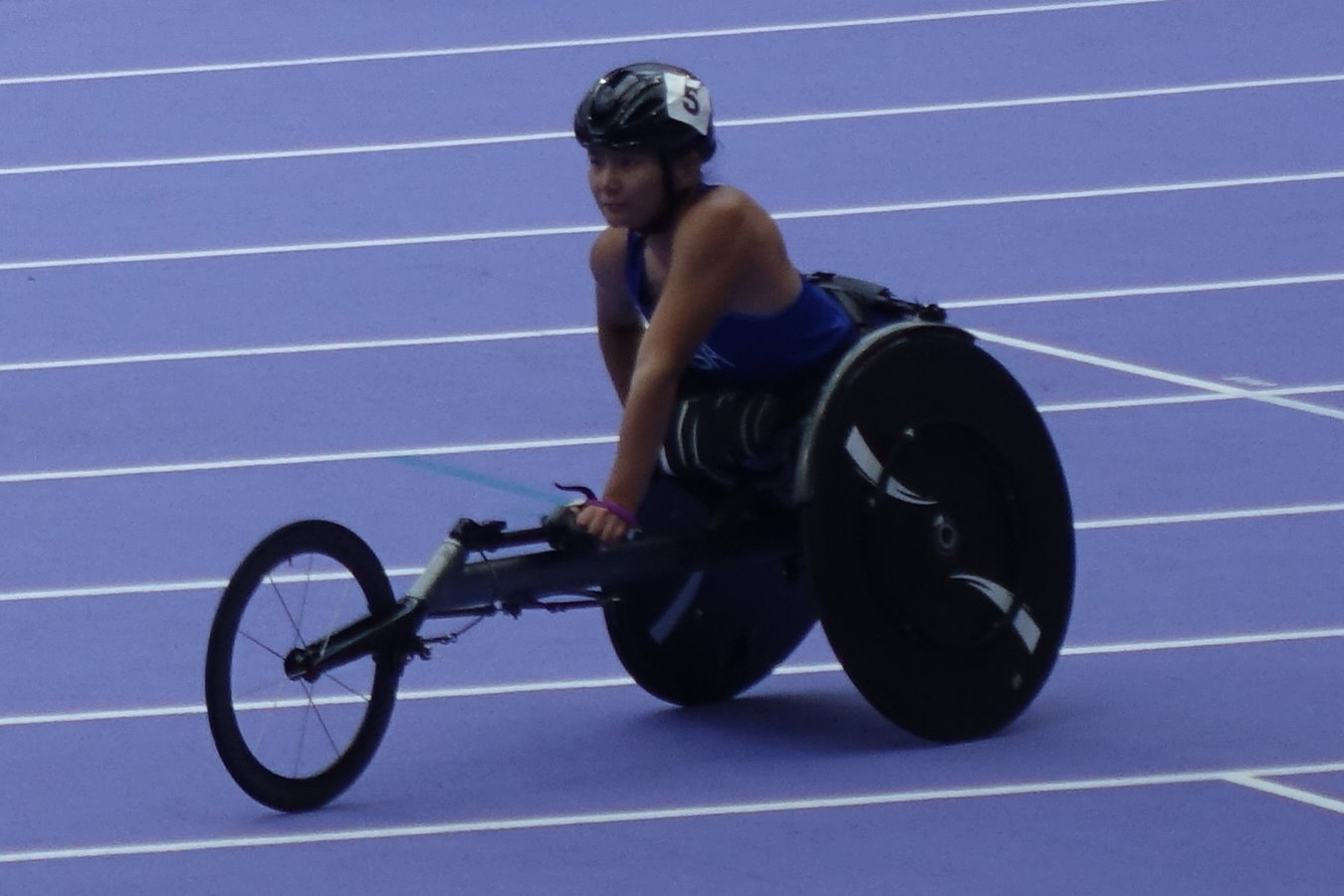
- Dederick at the 2024 Summer Paralympics

Personal information
- Full name: Hannah Xue Jia Dederick
- Nicknames: Han, Banana
- Born: Xua Jia; November 20, 2002 (age 23) Suzhou, China
- Home town: Mead, Washington, U.S.
- Height: 5 ft 4 in (1.62 m)
- Weight: 90 lb (41 kg)

Sport
- Country: United States
- Sport: Para athletics
- Disability: Spina bifida
- Disability class: T54
- Event(s): 100 metres 400 metres 800 metres 1500 metres 5000 metres
- Club: ParaSport Spokane/University of Illinois Wheelchair Track
- Coached by: Teresa Skinner/Adam Bleakney
Medal record
Para athletics
Representing United States
World Championships
Bronze medal – third place	2025 New Delhi	400m T54
Parapan American Games
Gold medal – first place	2019 Lima	100m T54
Gold medal – first place	2019 Lima	400m T54
Gold medal – first place	2023 Santiago	400m T54
Silver medal – second place	2019 Lima	800m T54
Silver medal – second place	2019 Lima	1500m T54
Bronze medal – third place	2019 Lima	5000m T54
World Junior Championships
Gold medal – first place	2017 Nottwil	100m T54
Gold medal – first place	2017 Nottwil	200m T54
Gold medal – first place	2017 Nottwil	400m T54
Gold medal – first place	2017 Nottwil	800m T54
Gold medal – first place	2019 Nottwil	100m T54
Gold medal – first place	2019 Nottwil	200m T54
Gold medal – first place	2019 Nottwil	400m T54
Gold medal – first place	2019 Nottwil	800m T54
Silver medal – second place	2017 Nottwil	1500m T54

Hannah Xue Jia Dederick (née Xua Jia; born November 20, 2002) is an American Paralympic athlete of Chinese descent who competes in sprinting events in international level events.

== Early life ==
Dederick was abandoned at a city hospital's steps in Suzhou as a baby before being adopted to an orphanage. She was adopted by a volunteer at the orphanage who took her to Oxford, Alabama in 2006. After living there for almost 4 years, she then moved with her family to Spokane, Washington in 2012 . When she was brought to the United States for the first time, her adopted family and the orphanage's volunteers were able to raise funds to enable Dederick to have corrective surgery to fix her spina bifida.
