= Amanda Kotaja =

Finnish Paralympic athlete (born 1995)

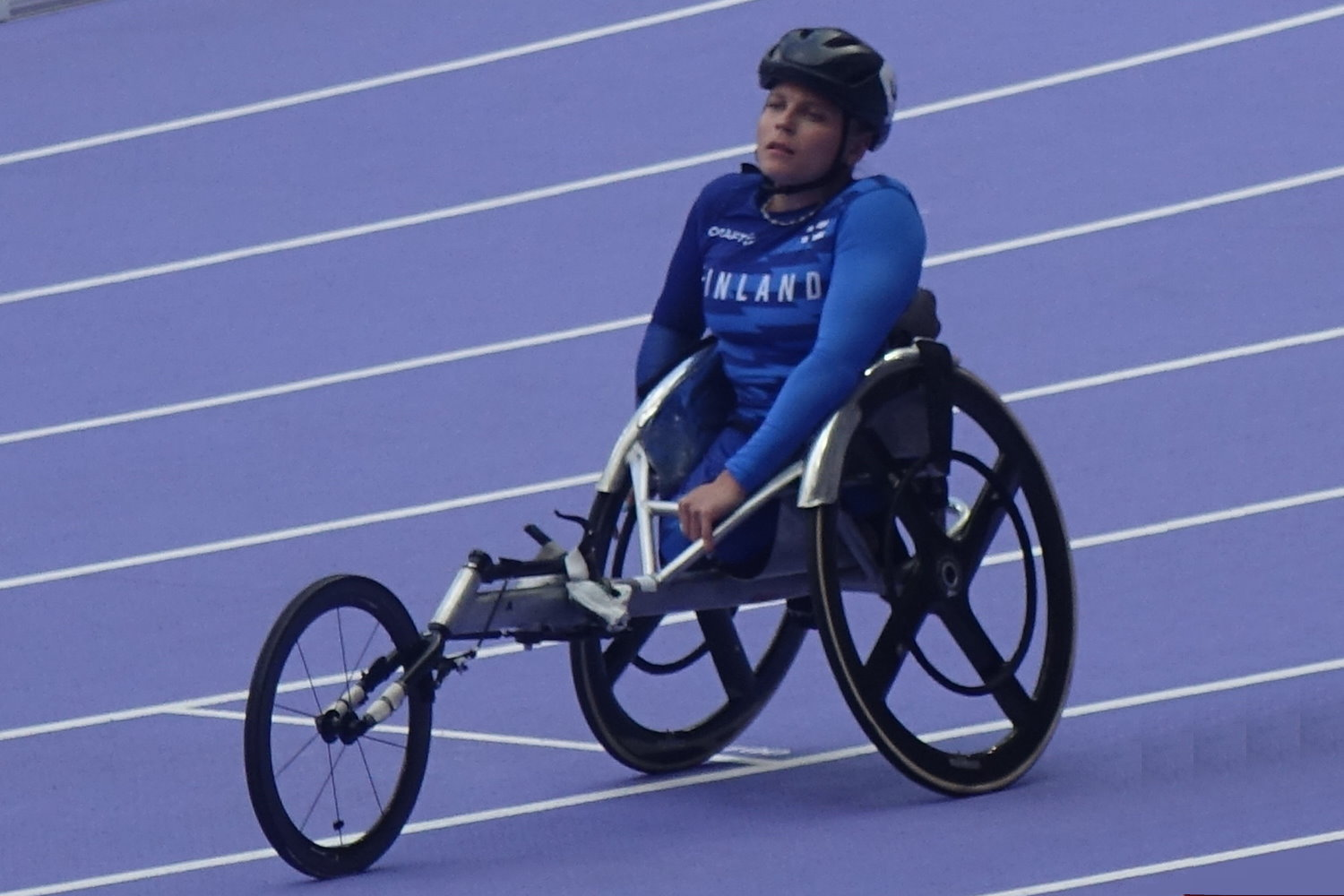
- Kotaja at the 2024 Summer Paralympics

Personal information
- Born: 3 January 1995 (age 31) Vampula, Finland
- Home town: Huittinen, Finland
- Height: 1.40 m (4 ft 7 in)

Sport
- Country: Finland
- Sport: Paralympic athletics
- Disability: Spina bifida
- Disability class: T54
- Event(s): 100 metres 200 metres 400 metres
- Club: Red Velvet Racing Team
- Coached by: Arno Mul; Jussi-Pekka Kurtti
Medal record
Paralympic athletics
Representing Finland
Paralympic Games
Silver medal – second place	2020 Tokyo	100m T54
Bronze medal – third place	2024 Paris	100m T54
World Championships
Gold medal – first place	2015 Doha	200m T54
Gold medal – first place	2017 London	100m T54
Gold medal – first place	2019 Dubai	100m T54
Gold medal – first place	2023 Paris	100m T54
Silver medal – second place	2013 Lyon	100m T54
Silver medal – second place	2013 Lyon	200m T54
Silver medal – second place	2015 Doha	100m T54
European Championships
Gold medal – first place	2012 Stadskanaal	100m T54
Gold medal – first place	2014 Swansea	100m T54
Gold medal – first place	2018 Berlin	100m T54
Silver medal – second place	2014 Swansea	400m T54
Bronze medal – third place	2018 Berlin	200m T54

Amanda Kotaja (born 3 January 1995) is a Finnish Paralympic athlete who competes in sprinting events in international level events.

== Career ==
She represented Finland at the 2020 Summer Paralympics in the 100 metres T54 event and won a silver medal. She is also a four-time World Para Athletics Championships champion, and a three-time World Para Athletics European Championships champion.
