= 2024 World Para Athletics Championships =

Paralympic track and field event

- Host city: Kobe
- Country: Japan
- Organizer: IPC
- Edition: 11
- Athletes: 1073 from 103 nations
- Sport: Para-athletics
- Events: 168
- Dates: 17–25 May 2024
- Main venue: Kobe Universiade Memorial Stadium

The 2024 World Para Athletics Championships was a para-athletics meet organized by the World Para Athletics, the respective sport branch of the International Paralympic Committee.

This was the 11th edition of the event and was held at Kobe Universiade Memorial Stadium in Japan, from 17 to 25 May 2024. This was the first time the event was held in East Asia.

The event was initially scheduled for September 2021 but it was rescheduled to avoid clashing with the 2020 Summer Paralympics which were rescheduled due to the COVID-19 pandemic.

In January 2022, the organisers requested World Para Athletics for postponement of the event until 2024 due to COVID-19 concerns. A week later, World Para Athletics confirmed that the event would not be held in 2022.

== Event details ==
Event	Men	Women
100 m	Details	Details
200 m	Details	Details
400 m	Details	Details
800 m	Details	Details
1500 m	Details	Details
5000 m	Details	Details
4×100 m relay	Details	
High jump	Details	N/A
Long jump	Details	Details
Shot put	Details	Details
Discus throw	Details	Details
Javelin throw	Details	Details
Club throw	Details	Details

== Medal table ==
* Host nation (Japan)

Rank	Nation	Gold	Silver	Bronze	Total
1	China	33	30	24	87
2	Brazil	19	12	11	42
–	Neutral Paralympic Athletes (NPA)	8	13	17	38
3	Uzbekistan	7	4	2	13
4	Great Britain	7	2	3	12
5	United States	6	13	5	24
6	India	6	5	6	17
7	Germany	6	2	1	9
8	Colombia	5	5	6	16
9	Algeria	5	4	4	13
10	Belgium	5	0	0	5
11	Tunisia	4	6	7	17
12	Iran	4	5	5	14
13	Azerbaijan	4	0	0	4
14	Mexico	3	4	7	14
15	Netherlands	3	3	5	11
16	Malaysia	3	1	2	6
17	Morocco	2	4	3	9
18	New Zealand	2	4	2	8
18	Spain	2	4	2	8
20	Turkey	2	2	4	8
21	Ecuador	2	2	3	7
22	South Africa	2	2	2	6
23	Poland	2	2	1	5
24	Ethiopia	2	1	0	3
24	France	2	1	0	3
26	Hungary	2	0	3	5
27	Cuba	2	0	0	2
27	Italy	2	0	0	2
27	United Arab Emirates	2	0	0	2
30	Serbia	1	3	1	5
31	Mauritius	1	2	0	3
31	Venezuela	1	2	0	3
33	Australia	1	1	3	5
34	Bulgaria	1	1	0	2
34	Dominican Republic	1	1	0	2
34	Kuwait	1	1	0	2
37	Indonesia	1	0	5	6
38	Finland	1	0	3	4
39	Namibia	1	0	1	2
40	Costa Rica	1	0	0	1
40	Georgia	1	0	0	1
40	Jordan	1	0	0	1
40	Saudi Arabia	1	0	0	1
44	Japan*	0	9	12	21
45	Greece	0	3	1	4
46	Portugal	0	3	0	3
47	Croatia	0	2	1	3
48	Canada	0	2	0	2
49	Sri Lanka	0	1	2	3
50	Austria	0	1	1	2
50	South Korea	0	1	1	2
50	Thailand	0	1	1	2
53	Latvia	0	1	0	1
53	Nigeria	0	1	0	1
55	Norway	0	0	2	2
56	Botswana	0	0	1	1
56	Iraq	0	0	1	1
56	Lithuania	0	0	1	1
56	Slovakia	0	0	1	1
56	Switzerland	0	0	1	1
Totals (60 entries)		168	167	164	499

== Placing table ==
Points were awarded for each athlete finishing in the top 8 of their competition, on a 8 to 1 point scale.

Rank	Name (country)	Points	Athletes	Events
1	China	747	74	137
2	Brazil	404.5	47	77
3	Japan	287.5	66	88
4	United States	254	30	50
5	Colombia	204	30	52
6	India	177.5	40	43
7	Uzbekistan	153	24	34
8	Algeria	152	20	34
9	Mexico	151	24	32
10	Tunisia	147	16	25
11	Great Britain	134	17	27
12	Germany	127	18	28
13	Iran	116	18	20
14	Morocco	116	16	24
15	Spain	93	18	23
16	Australia	90	20	27
17	Turkey	82	16	24
18	Netherlands	80	8	12
19	South Africa	78.5	14	21
20	Greece	76	19	23
Total (94 Nations)		-	1073	168

== Participation ==
1073 athletes from 103 National Paralympic Committees took part.

NPA: Russia + Belarus

1. Algeria (20)
2. Angola (3)
3. Argentina (6)
4. Armenia (2)
5. Australia (20)
6. Austria (5)
7. Azerbaijan (5)
8. Bahrain (2)
9. Belgium (7)
10. Bermuda (1)
11. Botswana (5)
12. Brazil (47)
13. Bulgaria (4)
14. Cameroon (8)
15. Canada (6)
16. Chile (3)
17. China (74)
18. Chinese Taipei (2)
19. Colombia (30)
20. Costa Rica (2)
21. Croatia (10)
22. Cuba (14)
23. Cyprus (1)
24. Czech Republic (6)
25. Denmark (9)
26. Dominican Republic (7)
27. Ecuador (12)
28. Egypt (5)
29. Estonia (1)
30. Ethiopia (4)
31. Fiji (3)
32. Finland (7)
33. France (17)
34. Georgia (3)
35. Germany (18)
36. Great Britain (17)
37. Greece (19)
38. Guatemala (1)
39. Guinea (1)
40. Hong Kong (4)
41. Hungary (6)
42. Iceland (2)
43. India (40)
44. Indonesia (11)
45. Iran (18)
46. Iraq (5)
47. Israel (3)
48. Italy (9)
49. Japan (66) (Host)
50. Jordan (3)
51. Kazakhstan (5)
52. Kenya (13)
53. Kuwait (4)
54. Laos (2)
55. Latvia (7)
56. Lithuania (17)
57. Macau (2)
58. Malaysia (11)
59. Mauritius (12)
60. Mexico (24)
61. Moldova (5)
62. Mongolia (4)
63. Montenegro (1)
64. Morocco (16)
65. Namibia (11)
66. Netherlands (8)
67. NPA (52)
68. New Zealand (5)
69. Nigeria (3)
70. Norway (10)
71. Oman (2)
72. Panama (7)
73. Peru (4)
74. Philippines (4)
75. Poland (18)
76. Portugal (13)
77. Puerto Rico (3)
78. Qatar (4)
79. South Korea (6)
80. Romania (6)
81. Saudi Arabia (15)
82. Senegal (3)
83. Serbia (6)
84. Singapore (4)
85. Slovakia (1)
86. Slovenia (1)
87. South Africa (14)
88. Spain (18)
89. Sri Lanka (6)
90. Sweden (3)
91. Switzerland (8)
92. Thailand (24)
93. Timor-Leste (1)
94. Trinidad and Tobago (1)
95. Tunisia (16)
96. Turkey (16)
97. Uganda (3)
98. United Arab Emirates (9)
99. United States (30)
100. Uzbekistan (24)
101. Venezuela (8)
102. Vietnam (5)

== See also ==
- Athletics at the 2024 Summer Paralympics
