= Marie Perrine =

Mauritian para athlete (born 1998)

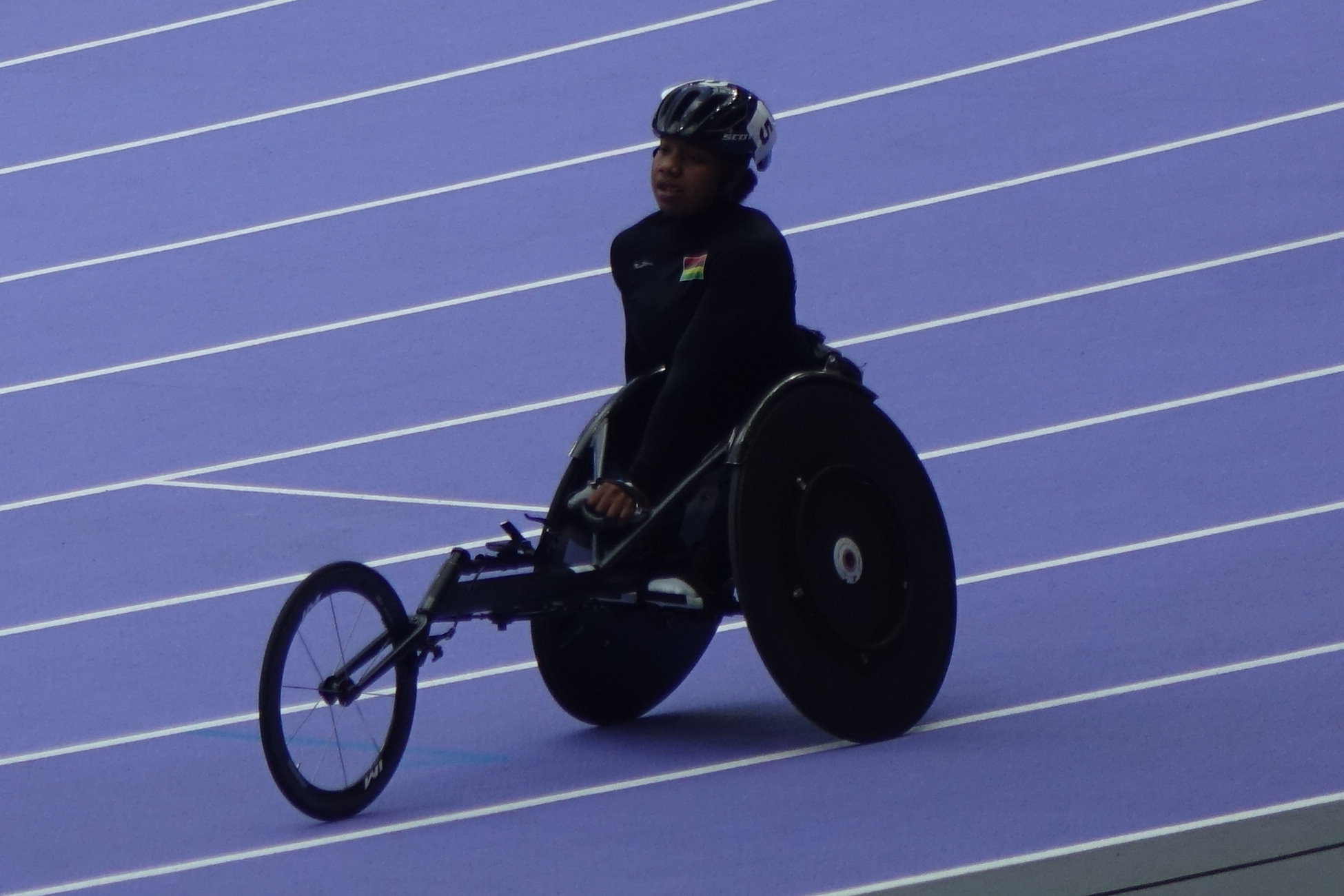
- Perrine at the 2024 Paralympics

Personal information
- Nationality: Mauritius

Marie Desirella Brandy Perrine (born September 8 1998) is a Mauritian para athlete who has competed in track events at the 2016, 2020, and 2024 Paralympics. She reached the final of the 100m T54 in 2024 where she placed last.
