= T54 (classification) =

Para-athletics classification

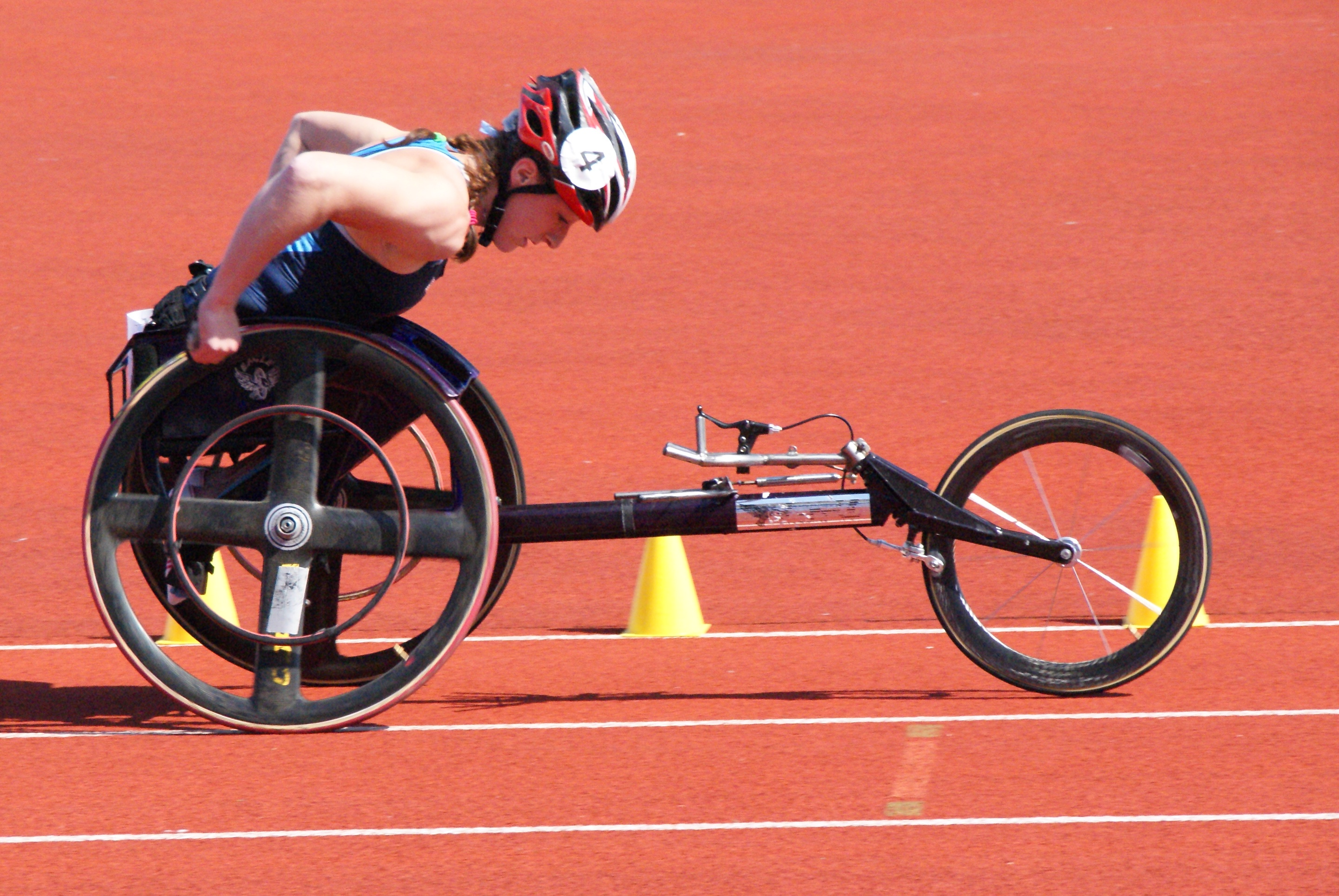
Tatyana McFadden at the Paralympic World Cup 2009

T54 is a disability sport classification for disability athletics in the track and jump events. The class includes people with spinal cord injuries who compete using a wheelchair in track events. They have paraplegia, but have normal hand and arm function, normal or limited trunk function, and no leg function. This class includes CP-ISRA classes CP3 and CP4, and some athletes in ISOD classes A1, A2 and A3.

== Definition ==
This classification is for track and jump events in disability athletics. This classification is one of several classifications for athletes with spinal cord injuries. Similar classifications are T51, T52 and T53. The International Paralympic Committee defined this class in 2011 as, "These athletes will have normal arm muscle power with a range of trunk muscle power extending from partial trunk control to normal trunk control. Athletes who compete in this group may have significant leg muscle power. These athletes have reasonable to normal trunk control which allows them to hold their trunk down when the propulsion force is applied to the push rim. Usually do not interrupt the pushing cycle to adjust the compensator. Can shift direction of the chair by sitting up and applying a trunk rotational force to the chair. Equivalent activity limitation to person with complete cord injury at cord level T8-S4."

The International Paralympic Committee defined this classification on their website in July 2016 as, "Athletes have full upper muscle power in the arms and some to full muscle power in the trunk. Athletes may have some function in the legs."

== Performance and rules ==
Wheelchairs used by this class have three wheels, with a maximum rear height of 70 centimetres (28 in) and maximum front height of 50 centimetres (20 in). Chairs cannot have mirrors or any gears. They are not allowed to have anything protruding from the back of the chair. As opposed to wearing hip numbers, racers in this class wear them on the helmet. Instead of wearing bibs, these numbers are put on the back of the racing chair and the racer.

"On your marks" is used to indicate that the athlete should approach or be at the starting line. "Set" means the athlete should take their final starting position, with the front wheel touching the ground behind the starting line. At this stage, no further movement is allowed until the starting gun is fired or a "Go" command given. Because this is a wheelchair class, different rules apply for overtaking with the responsibility lying with the racer coming from behind. They must be completely clear of the front wheel of the racer they are overtaking before cutting in front of them. The racer being overtaken cannot deliberately obstruct or impede the racer doing the overtaking. If a crash occurs within the first 50 meters of a race that is 800 meters or longer, the starting official has the option of recalling the race.

In relay events involve this class, each team has two lanes. Racers don't use a baton, but instead transfer via touch of the body in the exchange zone. The incoming racer cannot use their momentum to push and give the ongoing racer any acceleration. The acceleration zone is 20 meters, with the take over zone being 20 meters.

In wheelchair races, the winner and time is determined by when the center of the front axle goes across the finish line.

== Events ==
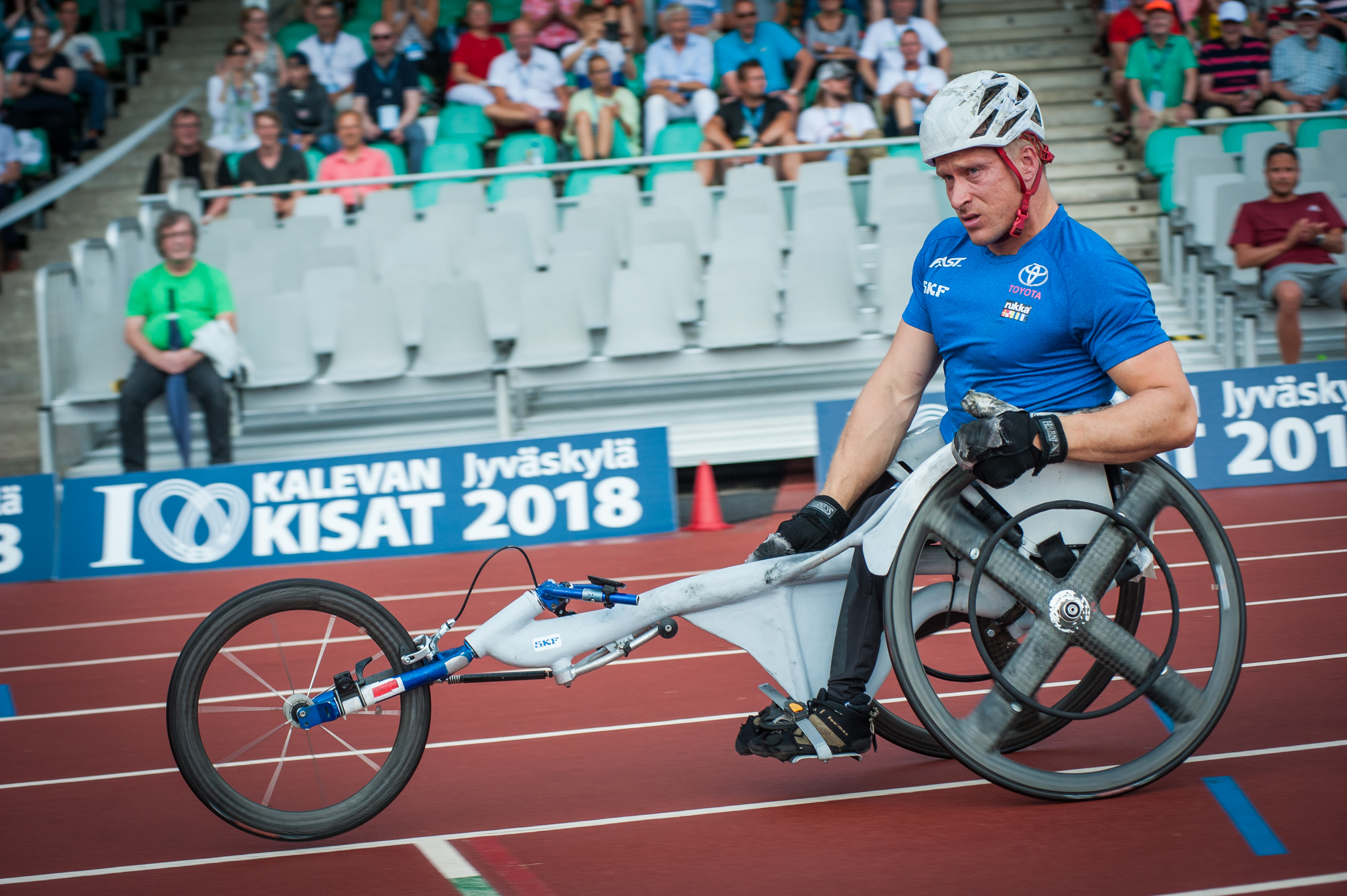
Leo-Pekka Tähti was at the top of the world in the T54 class for twenty years

There are a number of different events open to people in this class internationally. Many competitions have their own minimum qualifying standards.

Qualification standards for the 2016 Summer Paralympics
Event	Men		Women	
Event	AQS	BQS	AQS	BQS
100 metres	14.65	15.15	17.80	18.90
400 metres	47.80	50.00	58.50	1:03.00
800 metres	1:37.00	1:38.80	1:58.00	2:10.00
1500 metres	3:02.70	3:09.00	3:42.00	4:00.00
5000 metres	10:24.00	10:50.00	12:00.00	13:30.00
Marathon	1:32:00.00	1:35:00.00	1:55:00.00	2:05:00.00

In distances of 800 metres or more, the Paralympic record is superior to the able-bodied world record.

== History ==
This classification was created by the International Paralympic Committee and has roots in a 2003 attempt to address "the overall objective to support and co-ordinate the ongoing development of accurate, reliable, consistent and credible sport focused classification systems and their implementation."

== Becoming classified ==
For this class, classification generally has four phases. The first stage of classification is a health examination. For amputees in this class, this is often done on site at a sports training facility or competition. The second stage is observation in practice, the third stage is observation in competition and the last stage is assigning the sportsperson to a relevant class. For wheelchair athletes in this class with spinal cord injuries, they both undergo a medical assessment of muscle strength, range of movement or amputations; they then demonstrate their athletics skills, such as pushing a racing wheelchair.

During the observation phase involving training or practice, all athletes in this class may be asked to demonstrate their skills in athletics, such as pushing a racing wheelchair. A determination is then made as to what classification an athlete should compete in. Classifications may be Confirmed or Review status. For athletes who do not have access to a full classification panel, Provisional classification is available; this is a temporary Review classification, considered an indication of class only, and generally used only in lower levels of competition.

While some people in this class may be ambulatory, they generally go through the classification process while using a wheelchair. This is because they often compete from a seated position. Failure to do so could result in them being classified as an ambulatory class competitor. For people in this class with amputations, classification is often based on the anatomical nature of the amputation. The classification system takes several things into account when putting people into this class; these include which limbs are affected, how many limbs are affected, and how much of a limb is missing for people with amputations.

== Competitors ==
Notable athletics competitors in this class include multiple Paralympic medal winners Chantal Petitclerc (CAN), Kurt Fearnley (AUS), David Weir (GBR) and Tatyana McFadden (USA). Leo-Pekka Tähti (FIN) is the current world record holder in Men's T54 100m and has won four Paralympic gold medals in this class.
