= Athletics at the 2024 Summer Paralympics – Women's 1500 metres =

Athletics – Women's 1500 metres at the XVII Paralympic Games
- Venue: Stade de France
- Dates: 30 August – 6 September 2024
- No. of events: 4

1500 metres at the 2024 Summer Paralympics
Men's · T11 · T13 · T20 · T38 · T46 · T54 · Women's · T11 · T13 · T20 · T54

The Women's 1500m athletics events for the 2024 Summer Paralympics took place at the Stade de France from 30 August to 6 September, 2024. A total of 4 events were contested over this distance.

== Schedule ==
R	Round 1	F	Final

Date	Fri 30		Sat 31		Sun 1		Mon 2		Tue 3		Wed 4		Thu 5		Fri 6	
Event	M	E	M	E	M	E	M	E	M	E	M	E	M	E	M	E
T11 1500m					R		F									
T13 1500m				F												
T20 1500m															F	
T54 1500m							R		F							

== Medal summary ==
The following is a summary of the medals awarded across all 1500 metres events.

Classification	Gold		Silver		Bronze	
T11	Yayesh Gate Tesfaw; Ethiopia; Guide: Kindu Girma	4:27.68	He Shanshan; China; Guide: You Junjie	4:32.82	Louzanne Coetzee; South Africa; Guide: Erasmus Badenhorst	4:35.49
T13	Tigist Mengistu; Ethiopia	4:22.39	Fatima Ezzahra; Morocco	4:22.98	Liza Corso; United States	4:23.45
T20	Barbara Bieganowska-Zając; Poland	4:26.06 SB	Liudmyla Danylina; Ukraine	4:28.40 PB	Antônia Keyla; Brazil	4:29.40 AR
T54	Catherine Debrunner; Switzerland	3:13.10 PR	Samantha Kinghorn; Great Britain	3:16.01	Susannah Scaroni; United States	3:16.68

=== T11 ===
The T11 category is for athletes with a visual impairment. A T11 athlete may be entirely without sight, or be able to perceive light, but have no ability to see the shape of a hand at any distance. T11 athletes commonly run with guides.

The final in this classification took place on 2 September 2024, at 10:11:

Rank	Athlete	Nation	Time	Notes
1st place, gold medalist(s)	Yayesh Gate Tesfaw; Guide: Kindu Girma	Ethiopia	4:27.68	WR
2nd place, silver medalist(s)	He Shanshan; Guide: You Junjie	China	4:32.82	AR
3rd place, bronze medalist(s)	Louzanne Coetzee; Guide: Erasmus Badenhorst	South Africa	4:35.49	PB
4	Mary Njoroge; Guide: James Boit	Kenya	4:41.48	PB
5	Nancy Chelangat Koech; Guide: Geoffrey Rotich	Kenya	4:45.10	SB
6	Joanna Mazur; Guide: Michal Stawicki	Poland	4:59.71	

=== T13 ===
The T13 category is for athletes with a moderate visual impairment. Athletes in this category have a variety of visual impairments, but can typically recognize contours from a distance of 2 to 6 metres. Athletes in this category do not typically require a guide.

The final in this classification took place on 31 August 2024, at 19:13:

Rank	Lane	Name	Nationality	Time	Notes
1st place, gold medalist(s)	7	Tigist Mengistu	Ethiopia	4:22.39	
2nd place, silver medalist(s)	8	Fatima Ezzahra El Idrissi	Morocco	4:22.98	SB
3rd place, bronze medalist(s)	10	Liza Corso	United States	4:23.45	SB
4	5	Greta Streimikyte	Ireland	4:32.28	AR
5	6	Somaya Bousaid	Tunisia	4:34.87	
6	2	Peace Oroma	Uganda	4:38.60	PB
7	11	Francy Osorio	Colombia	4:40.70	SB
8	9	Elena Pautova	Neutral Paralympic Athletes	4:49.57	SB
9	1	Keegan Gaunt	Canada	4:51.43	
10	3	Edneusa de Jesus Santos	Brazil	5:16.28	SB
—	4	Daniela Velasco	Mexico	DQ	R7.9.5

=== T20 ===
The T20 category is for athletes with intellectual impairment. T20 athletes have an IQ score of 75 or less.

The final in this classification took place on 6 September 2024, at 10:56:

Rank	Lane	Name	Nationality	Time	Notes
1st place, gold medalist(s)	8	Barbara Bieganowska-Zając	Poland	4:26.06	SB
2nd place, silver medalist(s)	1	Liudmyla Danylina	Ukraine	4:28.40	PB
3rd place, bronze medalist(s)	4	Antônia Keyla da Silva	Brazil	4:29.40	AR
4	7	Annabelle Colman	Australia	4:31.54	AR
5	9	Hannah Taunton	Great Britain	4:38.98	SB
6	3	Kaitlin Bounds	United States	4:40.30	PB
7	5	Ilona Biacsi	Hungary	4:54.41	
8	2	Bernadett Biacsi	Hungary	5:00.12	
9	6	Moeko Yamamoto	Japan	5:16.70	

=== T54 ===
The T54 category is for wheelchair athletes with no leg function, but near full arm function and reasonable to normal trunk function. Typically this may be caused by a lower spinal cord injury or spinal cord birth defect.

The final in this classification took place on 3 September 2024, at 12:25:

Rank	Name	Nationality	Time	Notes
1st place, gold medalist(s)	Catherine Debrunner	Switzerland	3:13.10	PR
2nd place, silver medalist(s)	Samantha Kinghorn	Great Britain	3:16.01	
3rd place, bronze medalist(s)	Susannah Scaroni	United States	3:16.68	
4	Patricia Eachus	Switzerland	3:18.38	
5	Madison de Rozario	Australia	3:20.32	
6	Tian Yajuan	China	3:20.54	
7	Eden Rainbow-Cooper	Great Britain	3:22.09	
8	Melanie Woods	Great Britain	3:23.37	
9	Aline Rocha	Brazil	3:23.43	
10	Zhou Zhaoqian	China	3:53.20	
–	Manuela Schaer	Switzerland	DQ	R18.4
