= Athletics at the 2020 Summer Paralympics – Women's 1500 metres =

The Women's 1500m athletics events for the 2020 Summer Paralympics took place at the Tokyo National Stadium from August 28 to September 3, 2021. A total of 4 events were contested over this distance.

== Schedule ==
R	Round 1	½	Semifinals	F	Final

Date	Sat 28		Sun 29		Mon 30		Tue 31		Wed 1		Thu 2		Fri 3	
Event	M	E	M	E	M	E	M	E	M	E	M	E	M	E
T11 1500m			R		F									
T13 1500m		F												
T20 1500m													F	
T54 1500m						R		F						

== Medal summary ==
The following is a summary of the medals awarded across all 1500 metres events.

Classification	Gold		Silver		Bronze	
T11	Mexico; Mónica Olivia Rodríguez; Guide: Kevin Aguilar	4:37.40 WR	South Africa; Louzanne Coetzee; Guide: Erasmus Badenhorst	4:40.96 AR	Kenya; Nancy Chelangat Koech; Guide: Geoffrey Rotich	4:45.58
T13	Tigist Mengistu; Ethiopia	4:23.24	Liza Corso; United States	4:30.67	Somaya Bousaid; Tunisia	4:31.78
T20	Barbara Bieganowska-Zajac; Poland	4:27.84	Liudmyla Danylina; Ukraine	4:32.82	Hannah Taunton; Great Britain	4:35.34
T54	Zhou Zhaoqian; China	3:27.63	Manuela Schär; Switzerland	3:28.01	Madison de Rozario; Australia	3:28.24

== Results ==
The following were the results of the finals only of each of the Women's 1500 metres events in each of the classifications. Further details of each event, including where appropriate heats and semi finals results, are available on that event's dedicated page.

=== T11 ===
The T11 category is for athletes with a visual impairment. A T11 athlete may be entirely without sight, or be able to perceive light, but have no ability to see the shape of a hand at any distance. T11 athletes commonly run with guides.

The final in this classification took place on 30 August, at 9:38:

Rank	Name	Nationality	Time	Notes
1st place, gold medalist(s)	Mónica Olivia Rodríguez	Mexico	4:37.40	WR
2nd place, silver medalist(s)	Louzanne Coetzee	South Africa	4:40.96	AR
3rd place, bronze medalist(s)	Nancy Chelangat Koech	Kenya	4:45.58	SB
4	Joanna Mazur	Poland	4:48.74	AR
5	Susana Rodríguez	Spain	4:52.67	
6	He Shanshan	China	4:52.72	

=== T13 ===
The T13 category is for athletes with a moderate visual impairment. Athletes in this category have a variety of visual impairments, but can typically recognize contours from a distance of 2 to 6 metres. Athletes in this category do not typically require a guide.

The final in this classification took place on 28 August 2021, at 19:10:

Rank	Name	Nationality	Time	Notes
1st place, gold medalist(s)	Tigist Gezahagn Menigstu	Ethiopia	4:23.24	PB
2nd place, silver medalist(s)	Liza Corso	United States	4:30.67	PB
3rd place, bronze medalist(s)	Somaya Bousaid	Tunisia	4:31.78	
4	Veronika Zotova	RPC	4:33.96	AR
5	Greta Streimikyte	Ireland	4:34.82	
6	Izaskun Osés Ayúcar	Spain	4:39.92	PB
7	Daniela Velasco	Mexico	4:40.25	SB
8	Elena Pautova	RPC	5:00.76	
9	Edneusa Dorta	Brazil	5:02.84	SB
10	Francy Osorio	Colombia	5:05.08	
11	Meryem En-Nourhi	Morocco	5:34.20	
	Fatima Ezzahra El Idrissi	Morocco	DNF	

=== T20 ===
The T20 category is for athletes with intellectual impairment. T20 athletes have an IQ score of 75 or less.

The final in this classification took place on 3 September 2021, at 10:26:

Rank	Name	Nationality	Time	Notes
1st place, gold medalist(s)	Barbara Bieganowska-Zajac	Poland	4:27.84	SB
2nd place, silver medalist(s)	Liudmyla Danylina	Ukraine	4:32.82	SB
3rd place, bronze medalist(s)	Hannah Taunton	Great Britain	4:35.34	PB
4	Anju Furuya	Japan	4:38.58	SB
5	Ilona Biacsi	Hungary	4:53.36	
6	Sayaka Makita	Japan	4:54.60	
7	Moeko Yamamoto	Japan	4:55.03	
8	Bernadett Biacsi	Hungary	4:58.41	

=== T54 ===
The T54 category is for wheelchair athletes with no leg function, but near full arm function and reasonable to normal trunk function. Typically this may be caused by a lower spinal cord injury or spinal cord birth defect.

The final in this classification took place on 31 August 2021, at 20:56:

Rank	Athlete	Nation	Time	Notes
1st place, gold medalist(s)	Zhou Zhaoqian	China	3:27.63	PB
2nd place, silver medalist(s)	Manuela Schär	Switzerland	3:28.01	
3rd place, bronze medalist(s)	Madison de Rozario	Australia	3:28.24	
4	Merle Menje	Germany	3:28.64	
5	Tatyana McFadden	United States	3:28.85	
6	Zou Lihong	China	3:29.07	
7	Nikita den Boer	Netherlands	3:29.11	
8	Vanessa Cristina de Sousa	Brazil	3:30.55	
9	Susannah Scaroni	United States	3:35.53	
10	Marie Emmanuelle Anais Alphonse	Mauritius	3:39.83	
