= Athletics at the 2020 Summer Paralympics – Women's 1500 metres T13 =

Women's 1500 metres T13 at the XVI Paralympic Games
- Venue: Tokyo National Stadium
- Dates: 27 August 2021 (heats); 28 August 2021 (final)
- Competitors: 15 from 13 nations
- Winning time: 4:23.24

Medalists
1st place, gold medalist(s)		Tigist Gezahagn Mengistu	Ethiopia
2nd place, silver medalist(s)		Liza Corso	United States
3rd place, bronze medalist(s)		Somaya Bousaid	Tunisia

The women's 1500 metres T13 event at the 2020 Summer Paralympics in Tokyo took place between 27 and 28 August 2021.

The T13 category is for athletes with a moderate visual impairment. Athletes in this category have a variety of visual impairments, but can typically recognize contours from a distance of 2 to 6 metres. Athletes in this category do not typically require a guide.

== Records ==
Prior to the competition, the existing records were as follows:

World record	Marla Runyan (USA)	4:05.27	Seville, Spain	1 January 1999
Paralympic record	Somaya Bousaid (TUN)	4:21.45	Rio de Janeiro, Brazil	10 September 2016

Area	Time	Athlete	Nation
Africa	4:14.00	Somaya Bousaid	Tunisia
America	4:05.27 WR	Marla Runyan	United States
Asia	5:16.59	Ozra Mahdavikiya	Iran
Europe	4:39.27	Greta Streimikyte	Ireland
Oceania	4:53.18	Nellie Mitchell	Australia

== Results ==
=== Heats ===
Heat 1 took place on 27 August 2021, at 21:53:

Rank	Name	Nationality	Class	Time	Notes
1	Fatima Ezzahra El Idrissi	Morocco	T12	4:51.99	Q, SB
2	Somaya Bousaid	Tunisia	T13	4:52.04	Q
3	Veronika Zotova	RPC	T13	4:52.18	Q
4	Liza Corso	United States	T13	4:52.42	Q
5	Francy Osorio; Camilo Lancheros (guide)	Colombia	T12	4:55.31	q, SB
6	Edneusa Dorta; Cleiton Abrão (guide)	Brazil	T12	5:12.12	q, SB
7	Maria del Carmen Paredes Rodriguez; Lorenzo Sancheaz Martin (guide)	Spain	T12	5:56.71	

Heat 2 took place on 27 August 2021, at 22:03:

Rank	Name	Nationality	Class	Time	Notes
1	Tigist Gezahagn Menigstu	Ethiopia	T13	4:44.40	Q
2	Greta Streimikyte	Ireland	T13	4:45.98	Q
3	Izaskun Osés Ayúcar	Spain	T12	4:46.70	Q
4	Daniela Velasco; César Daniel Ortiz (guide)	Mexico	T12	4:47.16	Q, SB
5	Meryem En-Nourhi	Morocco	T12	5:03.78	q, SB
6	Elena Pautova; Grigoriy Andreev (guide)	RPC	T12	5:33.39	q
7	Taonele Banda	Malawi	T13	5:52.14	SB
	Nelly Nasimiyu Munialo; Erick Kirui (guide)	Kenya	T12	DQ	

=== Final ===
The final took place on 28 August 2021, at 19:10:

Rank	Name	Nationality	Class	Time	Notes
1st place, gold medalist(s)	Tigist Gezahagn Menigstu	Ethiopia	T13	4:23.24	PB
2nd place, silver medalist(s)	Liza Corso	United States	T13	4:30.67	PB
3rd place, bronze medalist(s)	Somaya Bousaid	Tunisia	T13	4:31.78	
4	Veronika Zotova	RPC	T13	4:33.96	AR
5	Greta Streimikyte	Ireland	T13	4:34.82	
6	Izaskun Osés Ayúcar	Spain	T12	4:39.92	PB
7	Daniela Velasco; César Daniel Ortiz (guide)	Mexico	T12	4:40.25	SB
8	Elena Pautova; Grigoriy Andreev (guide)	RPC	T12	5:00.76	
9	Edneusa Dorta; Cleiton Abrão (guide)	Brazil	T12	5:02.84	SB
10	Francy Osorio; Camilo Lancheros (guide)	Colombia	T12	5:05.08	
11	Meryem En-Nourhi	Morocco	T12	5:34.20	
	Fatima Ezzahra El Idrissi	Morocco	T12	DNF	
