= Ethiopia at the Paralympics =

- IPC code: ETH
- NPC: Ethiopian Paralympic Committee
- Medals Ranked 86th: Gold 3 Silver 3 Bronze 0 Total 6

Summer appearances
- 1968; 1972; 1976; 1980; 1984–2000; 2004; 2008; 2012; 2016; 2020; 2024

Ethiopia's participation in the Paralympic Games has been sporadic. The country made its Paralympic début at the 1968 Summer Games in Tel Aviv, sending two competitors who both competed in both athletics and table tennis. Ethiopia was then absent from the Games for almost a decade, returning in 1976 with a one-man delegation Abraham Habte, who entered athletics, lawn bowls and table tennis. In 1980, Habte was again Ethiopia's only representative, this time competing only in lawn bowls. Ethiopia then entered a prolonged period of absence, before sending a single runner (Kiros Tekle) to the 2004 Games. In 2008, the country entered a two-man delegation in athletics. In 2012, Wondiye Fikre Indelbu became the first Ethiopian to win a medal in the Paralympic Games, winning a silver in the men's 1500 meters - T46 event in athletics.

On 28 August 2021, Tigist Mengistu won Ethiopia's first ever gold medal at the Paralympics when she won the women's 1500m T13 final.

Ethiopia has never participated in the Winter Paralympics.

== Historical Medal Table ==
=== Medals by Summer Games ===
Games	Athletes	Gold	Silver	Bronze	Total	Rank
(Israel) Tel Aviv 1968	2	0	0	0	0	-
(Germany) Heidelberg 1972	did not participe					
(Germany) Toronto 1976	1	0	0	0	0	-
(Netherlands) Arnhem 1980	1	0	0	0	0	-
(United States) New York 1984 - (United Kingdom) Stoke Mandeville 1984	did not participe					
(South Korea) Seoul 1988	did not participe					
(Spain) Barcelona 1992	did not participe					
(United States) Atlanta 1996	did not participe					
(Australia) Sydney 2000	did not participe					
(Greece) Athens 2004	1	0	0	0	0	-
(China) Beijing 2008	2	0	0	0	0	29
(United Kingdom) London 2012	4	0	1	0	1	67
(Brazil) Rio de Janeiro 2016	5	0	1	0	1	69
(Japan) Tokyo 2020	1	1	0	0	1	59
(France) Paris 2024	4	2	1	0	3	44
(United States) Los Angeles 2028	Future event					
(Australia) Brisbane 2032	Future event					
Total		3	3	0	6	85

== Medals ==
Medal	Name	Sport	Event	Date
Silver	Wondiye Fikre Indelbu	Athletics	Men's 1500m T46	4 September 2012
Silver	Tamiru Demisse	Athletics	Men's 1500 m T12-13	11 September 2016
Gold	Tigist Mengistu	Athletics	Women's 1500 m T13	28 August 2021
Gold	Yayesh Gate Tesfaw	Athletics	Women's 1500 m T11	02 September 2024
Gold	Tigist Mengistu	Athletics	Women's 1500 m T13	31 August 2024
Silver	Yitayal Silesh Yigzaw	Athletics	Men's 1500 m T11	03 September 2024

== See also ==
- Ethiopia at the Olympics
