= Athletics at the 2024 Summer Paralympics – Women's 1500 metres T13 =

Women's 1500 metres T13 at the XVII Paralympic Games
- Venue: Stade de France
- Dates: 31 August 2024
- Competitors: 11 from 11 nations
- Winning time: 4:22.39

Medalists
1st place, gold medalist(s)		Tigist Mengistu	Ethiopia
2nd place, silver medalist(s)		Fatima Ezzahra El Idrissi	Morocco
3rd place, bronze medalist(s)		Liza Corso	United States

1500 metres at the 2024 Summer Paralympics
Men's · T11 · T13 · T20 · T38 · T46 · T54 · Women's · T11 · T13 · T20 · T54

The women's 1500 metres T13 event at the 2024 Summer Paralympics in Paris, took place on 31 August 2024.

The T13 category is for athletes with a moderate visual impairment. Athletes in this category have a variety of visual impairments, but can typically recognize contours from a distance of 2 to 6 metres. Athletes in this category do not typically require a guide.

== Records ==
Prior to the competition, the existing records were as follows:

T12
World Record	Assia El Hannouni (FRA)	4:19.20	(China) Beijing	14 September 2008
Paralympic Record	Assia El Hannouni (FRA)	4:19.20	(China) Beijing	14 September 2008

Area	Time		Athlete	Location	Date
Africa	4:22.15		(Morocco) Fatima Ezzahra El Idrissi	(France) Paris	10 July 2023
America	4:39.63		(Mexico) Daniela Velasco	(Peru) Lima	8 March 2019
Asia	4:55.91		(Uzbekistan) Yokutkhon Kholbekova	(Tunisia) Tunis	26 March 2016
Europe	4:19.20	WR	(France) Assia El Hannouni	(China) Beijing	14 September 2008
Oceania	Vacant				

T13
World Record	Marla Runyan (USA)	4:05.27	(Spain) Seville	1 January 1999
Paralympic Record	Somaya Bousaid (TUN)	4:21.45	(Brazil) Rio de Janeiro	10 September 2016

Area	Time		Athlete	Location	Date
Africa	4:14.00		(Tunisia) Somaya Bousaid	(China) Beijing	14 September 2008
America	4:05.27	WR	(United States) Marla Runyan	(Spain) Seville	1 January 1999
Asia	5:16.59		(Iran) Ozra Mahdavikiya	(Poland) Bydgoszcz	19 July 2019
Europe	4:33.27		(Republic of Ireland) Greta Streimikyte	(France) Paris	10 July 2023
Oceania	4:53.18		(Australia) Nellie Mitchell	(Australia) Gold Coast	June 2021

== Results ==
=== Final ===
Rank	Athlete	Nation	Class	Time	Notes
1st place, gold medalist(s)	Tigist Mengistu	Ethiopia	T13	4:22.39	
2nd place, silver medalist(s)	Fatima Ezzahra El Idrissi	Morocco	T12	4:22.98	SB
3rd place, bronze medalist(s)	Liza Corso	United States	T13	4:23.45	SB
4	Greta Streimikyte	Ireland	T13	4:32.28	AR
5	Somaya Bousaid	Tunisia	T13	4:34.87	
6	Peace Oroma	Uganda	T13	4:38.60	
7	Francy Osorio; Guide: William Higuera Ocampo	Colombia	T12	4:40.70	SB
8	Elena Pautova	Neutral Paralympic Athletes	T13	4:49.57	SB
9	Keegan Gaunt	Canada	T13	4:51.43	
10	Edneusa Dorta; Guide: Thiago Andre	Brazil	T12	5:16.28	SB
—	Daniela Velasco	Mexico	T12	DQ	R7.9.5
