= Athletics at the 2016 Summer Paralympics – Women's 1500 metres =

The Women's 1500m athletics events for the 2016 Summer Paralympics took place at the Estádio Olímpico João Havelange from 8 to 17 September. A total of four events were contested over this distance for eight different classifications.

== Schedule ==
R	Round 1	½	Semifinals	F	Final

Event↓/Date →	Thu 8	Fri 9	Sat 10	Sun 11	Mon 12	Tue 13	Wed 14	Thu 15	Fri 16	Sat 17
T11 1500m										F
T13 1500m	R		F							
T20 1500m									F	
T54 1500m					R	F				

Classification	Gold		Silver		Bronze	
T11	Jin Zheng guide: Jin Yubo; China	4:38.92	Nancy Chelangat Koech guide: Geoffrey Kiplangat Rotich; Kenya	4:42.12	Maritza Arango Buitrago guide: Jonathan Sanchez Gonzalez; Colombia	4:45.33
T13	Somaya Bousaid; Tunisia	4:21.45	Najah Chouaya; Tunisia	4:30.52	Izaskun Oses Ayucar; Spain	4:39.99
T20	Barbara Niewiedzial; Poland	4:24.37	Ilona Biacsi; Hungary	4:27.88	Liudmyla Danylina; Ukraine	4:28.78
T54	Tatyana McFadden; United States	3:22.50	Amanda McGrory; United States	3:22.61	Chelsea McClammer; United States	3:22.67

== Results ==
=== T11 ===
The T11 category is for athletes with a visual impairment. A T11 athlete may be entirely without sight, or be able to perceive light, but have no ability to see the shape of a hand at any distance. T11 athletes commonly run with guides.

17:38 17 September 2016:

Rank	Lane	Bib	Name	Nationality	Reaction	Time	Notes
1st place, gold medalist(s)	5	186	Jin Zheng	China		4:38.92	
2nd place, silver medalist(s)	4	486	Nancy Chelangat Koech	Kenya		4:42.12	
3rd place, bronze medalist(s)	3	210	Maritza Arango Buitrago	Colombia		4:45.33	
4	2	96	Renata Bazone Teixeira	Brazil		5:01.75	
5	1	555	Monica Olivia Rodriguez Saavedra	Mexico		5:03.14	
6	6	911	Ivonne Mosquera-Schmidt	United States		5:08.97	

=== T13 ===
The T13 category is for athletes with a moderate visual impairment. Athletes in this category have a variety of visual impairments, but can typically recognize contours from a distance of 2 to 6 metres. Athletes in this category do not typically require a guide.

11:13 10 September 2016:

Rank	Lane	Bib	Name	Nationality	Reaction	Time	Notes
1st place, gold medalist(s)	3	832	Somaya Bousaid	Tunisia		4:21.45	
2nd place, silver medalist(s)	2	834	Najah Chouaya	Tunisia		4:30.52	
3rd place, bronze medalist(s)	5	277	Izaskun Oses Ayucar	Spain		4:39.99	
4	1	435	Greta Streimikyte	Ireland		4:45.06	
5	6	212	Marcela Gonzalez	Colombia		4:49.37	
	4	560	Daniela Eugenia Velasco Maldonado	Mexico			DSQ

=== T20 ===
The T20 category is for athletes with intellectual impairment. T20 athletes have an IQ score of 75 or less.

11:09 16 September 2016:

Rank	Lane	Bib	Name	Nationality	Reaction	Time	Notes
1st place, gold medalist(s)	4	694	Barbara Niewiedzial	Poland		4:24.37	
2nd place, silver medalist(s)	8	406	Ilona Biacsi	Hungary		4:27.88	
3rd place, bronze medalist(s)	3	873	Liudmyla Danylina	Ukraine		4:28.78	
4	6	693	Arleta Meloch	Poland		4:33.19	
5	2	405	Bernadett Biacsi	Hungary		4:43.10	
6	7	469	Sayaka Makita	Japan		4:51.90	
7	5	480	Moeko Yamamoto	Japan		5:01.99	
	1	697	Sabina Stenka	Poland			DSQ

=== T54 ===
The T54 category is for wheelchair athletes with no leg function, but near full arm function and reasonable to normal trunk function. Typically this may be caused by a lower spinal cord injury or spinal cord birth defect.

18:14 13 September 2016:

Rank	Lane	Bib	Name	Nationality	Reaction	Time	Notes
1st place, gold medalist(s)	8	906	Tatyana McFadden	United States		3:22.50	
2nd place, silver medalist(s)	6	907	Amanda McGrory	United States		3:22.61	
3rd place, bronze medalist(s)	2	904	Chelsea McClammer	United States		3:22.67	
4	1	780	Manuela Schaer	Switzerland		3:23.41	
5	4	36	Madison de Rozario	Australia		3:24.33	
6	3	145	Diane Roy	Canada		3:24.57	
7	10	171	Jing Ma	China		3:24.88	
8	7	35	Christie Dawes	Australia		3:26.00	
9	9	111	Aline Rocha	Brazil		3:27.61	
10	5	787	Gunilla Wallengren	Sweden		3:30.14	
