= Athletics at the 2016 Summer Paralympics – Women's 1500 metres T13 =

Women's 1500 metres T13 at the XV Paralympic Games
- Venue: Estádio Olímpico João Havelange
- Dates: 0 September 2016
- Competitors: 12 from 8 nations

Medalists
1st place, gold medalist(s)		Somaya Bousaid	Tunisia
2nd place, silver medalist(s)		Najah Chouaya	Tunisia
3rd place, bronze medalist(s)		Izaskun Oses Ayucar	Spain

The T13 category is for athletes with a moderate visual impairment. Athletes in this category have a variety of visual impairments, but can typically recognize contours from a distance of 2 to 6 metres. Athletes in this category do not typically require a guide.

The Athletics at the 2016 Summer Paralympics – Women's 1500 metres T13 event at the 2016 Paralympic Games took place on 10 September 2016, at the Estádio Olímpico João Havelange.

== Heats ==
=== Heat 1 ===
11:30 8 September 2016:

Rank	Lane	Bib	Name	Nationality	Reaction	Time	Notes
1	5	834	Najah Chouaya	Tunisia		4:52.32	Q
2	2	560	Daniela Eugenia Velasco Maldonado	Mexico		4:56.74	Q
3	4	153	Margarita Faundez	Chile		5:01.93	
4	1	274	Elena Congost	Spain		5:11.68	
5	3	278	Maria del Carmen Paredes Rodriguez	Spain		5:19.03	
	6	535	Taonere Banda	Malawi			DSQ

=== Heat 2 ===
11:39 8 September 2016:

Rank	Lane	Bib	Name	Nationality	Reaction	Time	Notes
1	4	277	Izaskun Oses Ayucar	Spain		4:49.99	Q
2	6	832	Somaya Bousaid	Tunisia		4:50.87	Q
3	5	435	Greta Streimikyte	Ireland		4:51.75	q
4	3	212	Marcela Gonzalez	Colombia		4:54.11	q
5	1	558	Ana Isabel Tavera Gonzalez	Mexico		4:58.83	
	2	487	Nelly Nasimiyu Munialo	Kenya			DSQ

== Final ==
11:13 10 September 2016:

Rank	Lane	Bib	Name	Nationality	Reaction	Time	Notes
1st place, gold medalist(s)	3	832	Somaya Bousaid	Tunisia		4:21.45	
2nd place, silver medalist(s)	2	834	Najah Chouaya	Tunisia		4:30.52	
3rd place, bronze medalist(s)	5	277	Izaskun Oses Ayucar	Spain		4:39.99	
4	1	435	Greta Streimikyte	Ireland		4:45.06	
5	6	212	Marcela Gonzalez	Colombia		4:49.37	
	4	560	Daniela Eugenia Velasco Maldonado	Mexico			DSQ
