= Athletics at the 2016 Summer Paralympics – Men's 1500 metres T13 =

Men's 1500 metres T13 at the XV Paralympic Games
- Venue: Estádio Olímpico João Havelange
- Dates: 11 September
- Competitors: 14 from 10 nations
- Winning time: 3:48.29

Medalists
1st place, gold medalist(s)		Abdellatif Baka	Algeria
2nd place, silver medalist(s)		Tamiru Demisse	Ethiopia
3rd place, bronze medalist(s)		Henry Kirwa	Kenya

The Men's 1500 metres T13 event at the 2016 Summer Paralympics took place at the Estádio Olímpico João Havelange 11 September. Notably, the top four finishers have all unofficially beaten the winning time of the Men's 1500 metres in the Olympics in the same year in the same venue, which was won by Matthew Centrowitz Jr. with the time of 3:50.00.

The T13 category is for athletes with a moderate visual impairment. Athletes in this category have a variety of visual impairments, but can typically recognize contours from a distance of 2 to 6 metres. Athletes in this category do not typically require a guide.

== Results ==
=== T12/13 ===
Competed 11 September 2016 at 23:32.

Rank	Athlete	Country	Class	Time	Notes
1st place, gold medalist(s)	Abdellatif Baka	Algeria	T13	3:48.29	WR
2nd place, silver medalist(s)	Tamiru Demisse	Ethiopia	T13	3:48.49	PB
3rd place, bronze medalist(s)	Henry Kirwa	Kenya	T12	3:49.59	PB
4	Fouad Baka	Algeria	T13	3:49.84	PB
5	Łukasz Wietecki	Poland	T13	3:54.20	
6	Bilel Aloui	Tunisia	T13	3:54.61	PB
7	Jaryd Clifford	Australia	T12	3:56.67	
8	Youssef Benibrahim	Morocco	T13	3:56.80	
9	Guillaume Ouellet	Canada	T13	3:57.98	
10	Chaz Davis	United States	T12	3:58.28	
11	Yeltsin Jacques	Brazil	T12	3:58.92	
12	Julio Cesar Agripino dos Santos	Brazil	T12	4:00.61	
13	Abdelillah Mame	Morocco	T13	4:08.93	
14	Bilel Hammami	Tunisia	T13	DQ	
