= Ethiopia at the 1968 Summer Paralympics =

- IPC code: ETH (ETI used at these Games)
- NPC: Ethiopian Paralympic Committee

in Tel Aviv
- Competitors: 2 in 2 sports
- Medals: Gold 0 Silver 0 Bronze 0 Total 0

Summer Paralympics appearances (overview)
- 1968; 1972; 1976; 1980; 1984–2000; 2004; 2008; 2012; 2016; 2020; 2024

Ethiopia was one of 28 nations to send a delegation to the 1968 Summer Paralympics in Tel Aviv, Israel from November 4 to 13, 1968; two Ethiopian athletes competed, both of them men. Abraham Habte and Negatu (Note: Data is taken from the International Paralympic Committee website and is based on information contained/sourced in the original hardcopy final results publications. Some information from earlier Paralympic Games (i.e. 1960 – 1984) is incomplete and is missing first names of some athletes) each took part in both athletics and table tennis events. The team did not win any medals at these Games and, as of the 2010 Winter Paralympics, no Ethiopian athlete has won a medal at either the Summer or Winter Paralympics.

== Opening ceremony ==
Ethiopia entered the stadium during the Open Ceremonies ahead of Finland.

== Athletics ==
Negatu entered five athletics events; club throw C, shot put C, javelin C, the open precision javelin and 100 metres wheelchair C. He failed to advance to the finals in any of the events finishing 17th in the 100 metres, 38th in the club throw with a distance of 20.46 metres, 32nd in javelin with a throw of 12.90 metres, 65th in precision javelin with a score of 65 and 22nd in the shot put with a throw of 6.01 metres.

Abraham Habte competed in the men's club throw C and precision javelin events but did not make either final. He scored 56 points in the precision javelin to earn 53rd position and finished 41st in the club throw with a distance of 18.82 metres.

== Table tennis ==
Habte and Negatu both entered the men's singles C classification and teamed up in the doubles C. In the singles Negatu was eliminated in the first round and Habte was eliminated in the second round; the gold medal was won by Baruch Hagai for host nation Israel. In the doubles the Ethiopian pair was eliminated by the eventual gold medalists, Israel's Hagai and Arieh Rubin, in the first round.

== See also ==
- Ethiopia at the 1968 Summer Olympics
