= Malawi at the 2016 Summer Paralympics =

- IPC code: MAW
- NPC: Malawi Paralympic Committee

in Rio de Janeiro
- Competitors: 1 in 1 sports
- Flag bearer: Taonere Banda
- Medals: Gold 0 Silver 0 Bronze 0 Total 0

Summer Paralympics appearances (overview)
- 2012; 2016; 2020; 2024

Malawi competed at the 2016 Summer Paralympics in Rio de Janeiro, Brazil from 7 to 18 September 2016. The country's participation in Rio marked its debut appearance in the quadrennial event, although it had competed in the Summer Olympics ten times since the 1972 Games. The delegation consisted of a single middle-distance runner, Taonere Banda, who qualified for the games by using a wildcard. She was chosen as the flag bearer for the opening ceremony and was disqualified from her event, the 1500 metres (T13), for moving outside her lane during her heat.

== Background ==
Malawi first competed in the Summer Olympics at the 1972 Games in Munich, Germany. They participated on ten occasions prior to the 2016 Summer Paralympics, where they made their Summer Paralympics debut in Rio de Janeiro, Brazil, with the expectation of the 1976 Summer Olympics in Montreal and the 1980 Summer Games in the Soviet Union, the former because of a boycott relating to the New Zealand national rugby union team touring South Africa, and the latter because the country joined the United States-led boycott over the 1979 invasion of Afghanistan during the Soviet–Afghan War. Malawi intended to make its first appearance in the Summer Paralympics at the 2012 Games in London but withdrew hours before the opening ceremony started because of a lack of funding. The country participated in the Rio Paralympic Games from 7 to 18 September 2016. Malawi was one of six countries to make their first appearance in the quadrennial event; the others were Aruba, Congo, Somalia, São Tomé and Príncipe and Togo. They sent a single middle-distance runner, Taonere Banda, who was announced by the Malawi Paralympics Committee on 4 July, and was occupied by her coach George Luhanga. Banda was the flag bearer for the opening ceremony.

== Disability classifications ==
Every participant at the Paralympics has their disability grouped into one of five disability categories; amputation, the condition may be congenital or sustained through injury or illness; cerebral palsy; wheelchair athletes, there is often overlap between this and other categories; visual impairment, including blindness; Les autres, any physical disability that does not fall strictly under one of the other categories, for example dwarfism or multiple sclerosis. Each Paralympic sport then has its own classifications, dependent upon the specific physical demands of competition. Events are given a code, made of numbers and letters, describing the type of event and classification of the athletes competing. Some sports, such as athletics, divide athletes by both the category and severity of their disabilities, other sports, for example swimming, group competitors from different categories together, the only separation being based on the severity of the disability.

== Athletics ==
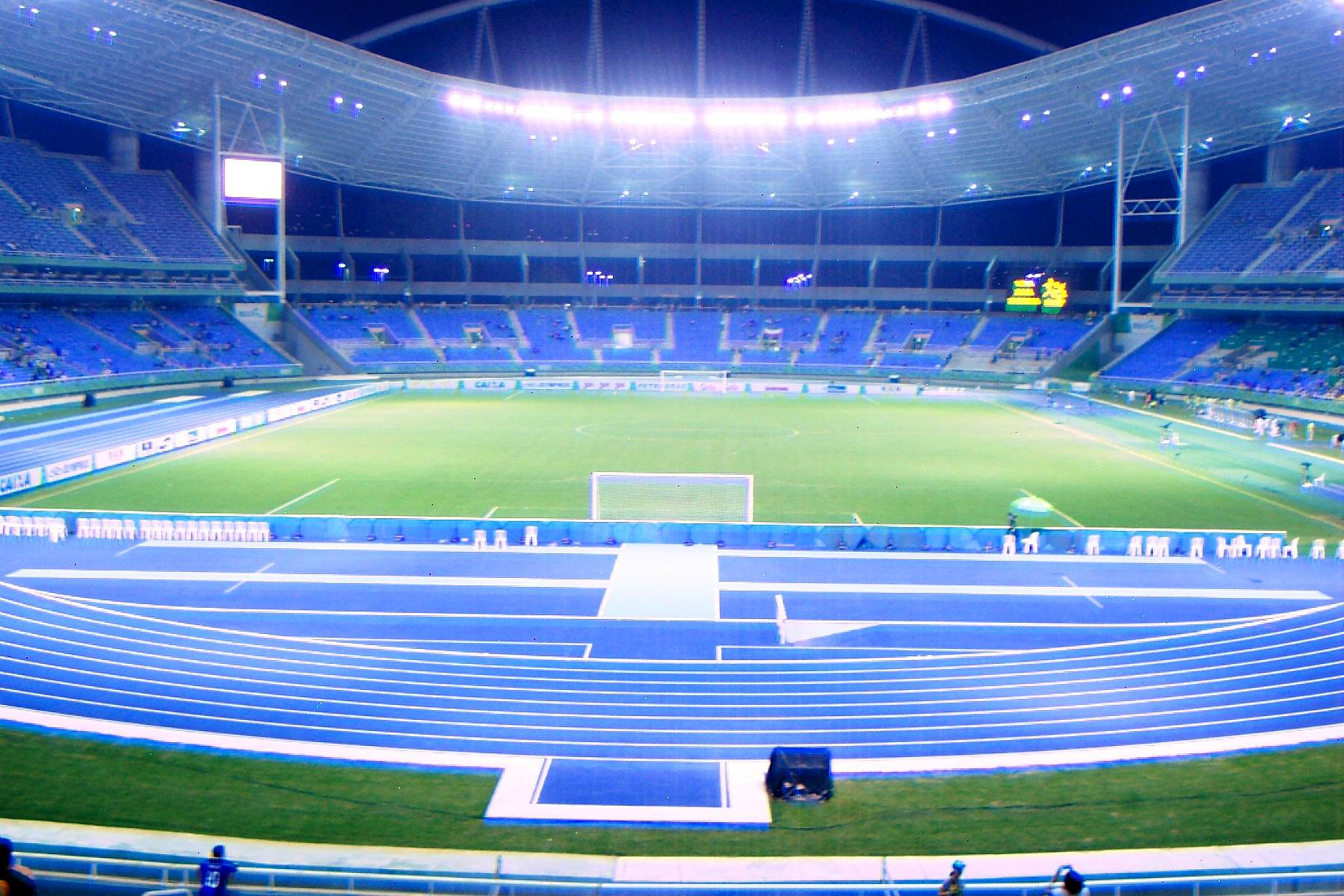
The Estádio Olímpico João Havelange, where Banda competed in athletics events.

Taonere Banda was the first Malawian Paralympic athlete to compete at the quadrennial event. She qualified for the games by using a wildcard because the country did not have any athletes who met the qualification standards. Banda spent the 60 days in the buildup to Rio training for the event, but amenities in Malawi were imperfect and she trained on a dusty, uneven running track without standard defined lanes. She stated that it had been her childhood ambition to represent Malawi at a major international sporting event and this was her sole opportunity to prove her athletic abilities in her event, the 1500 metres (T13). Banda was drawn in the first heat on 8 September. She attacked the first lap aggressively taking up a commanding lead, but her initial speed saw her tire in the latter stages and she lost the lead in the last 600 metres of the race to finish fourth. Banda was later disqualified when she was observed to leave her lane during the heat. Nevertheless, she said that when she returned to Malawi, she would encourage people with disabilities to work hard and participate in sporting events.

Women's Track

Athlete	Events	Heat		Final	
Athlete	Events	Time	Rank	Time	Rank
Taonere Banda	1500 m T12-13	Disqualified		did not advance	

== See also ==
- Malawi at the 2016 Summer Olympics
