= Francy =

Francy is a given name and surname. Notable people with the name include:

given name

- Francy Boland (1929–2005), Belgian jazz composer and pianist
- Francy Osorio (born 1983), Colombian Paralympic athlete
- Francy Rädelt (born 1996), German freestyle wrestler

surname

- Nedda Francy (1908–1982), Argentine actress
