= Athletics at the 2020 Summer Paralympics – Women's marathon T12 =

Women's marathon T12 at the XVI Paralympic Games
- Venue: Tokyo National Stadium
- Dates: 5 September 2021
- Competitors: 10 from 7 nations

Medalists
1st place, gold medalist(s)		Misato Michishita	Japan
2nd place, silver medalist(s)		Elena Pautova	RPC
3rd place, bronze medalist(s)		Louzanne Coetzee	South Africa

The women's marathon T12 event at the 2020 Summer Paralympics in Tokyo, took place on 5 September 2021.

The T12 category is for athletes with visual impairment. Athletes in this category will generally have some residual sight, the ability to recognise the shape of a hand at a distance of 2 metres and the ability to perceive clearly will be no more than 2/60. T12 athletes commonly run with guides.

== Records ==
Prior to the competition, the existing records were as follows:

World Record	Misato Michishita (JPN)	2:54:13	Hōfu, Japan	20 December 2020
Paralympic Record	Vacant	–		

Area	Time	Athlete	Nation
Africa	3:18:11	Record Mark	
America	3:05:03	Record Mark	
Asia	2:54:13 WR	Misato Michishita	Japan
Europe	2:58:23	Elena Pautova	Russia
Oceania	Vacant		

== Results ==
The race took place on 5 September 2021, at 6:50:

Rank	Name	Nationality	Class	Time	Notes
1st place, gold medalist(s)	Misato Michishita	Japan	T12	3:00:50	GR
2nd place, silver medalist(s)	Elena Pautova; Grigoriy Andreev (guide)	RPC	T12	3:04:16	SB
3rd place, bronze medalist(s)	Louzanne Coetzee	South Africa	T11	3:11:13	WR (T11)
4	Edneusa de Jesus Santos; Vilmar Roberto Dias (guide)	Brazil	T12	3:15:32	SB
5	Yumiko Fujii	Japan	T12	3:17:44	SB
6	Maria Fiuza	Portugal	T11	3:20:45	SB
7	Edilene Teixeira Boaventura	Brazil	T11	3:26:32	AR (T11)
8	Mihoko Nishijima	Japan	T12	3:29:12	SB
9	María del Carmen Paredes Rodríguez; Lorenzo Snachez Martin (guide)	Spain	T12	3:37:44	SB
	Meryem En-Nourhi	Morocco	T12		
