= Ethiopia at the 2012 Summer Paralympics =

- IPC code: ETH
- NPC: Ethiopian Paralympic Committee

in London
- Competitors: 4 in 1 sport
- Medals Ranked 67th: Gold 0 Silver 1 Bronze 0 Total 1

Summer Paralympics appearances (overview)
- 1968; 1972; 1976; 1980; 1984–2000; 2004; 2008; 2012; 2016; 2020; 2024

Ethiopia competed at the 2012 Summer Paralympics in London, United Kingdom from August 29 to September 9, 2012. .

Ethiopia won their first ever medal at the Paralympics, Wondiye Fikre Indelbu won a silver in the 1500m T46.

== Medallists ==
Medal	Name	Sport	Event	Date
Silver	Wondiye Fikre Indelbu	Athletics	Men's 1500m T46	4 September

== Athletics ==
Athlete	Event	Heat		Final	
Athlete	Event	Result	Rank	Result	Rank
Wondiye Fikre Indelbu	Men's 1500m T46	4:00.21 SB	2 Q	3:50.87 PB	2nd place, silver medalist(s)
Tesfalem Kebede	Men's 800m T46	1:57.22	6	Did not advance	
Tesfalem Kebede	Men's 1500m T46	4:09.51 SB	5	Did not advance	
Kiross Redae	Men's 800m T46	1:59.95	4	Did not advance	
Yengus Azenaw	Women's 100m T46	14.41	5	Did not advance	
Yengus Azenaw	Women's 200m T46	29.96	6	Did not advance	
Yengus Azenaw	Women's 400m T46	—		1:04.93	6

== See also ==
- Ethiopia at the Paralympics
- Ethiopia at the 2012 Summer Olympics
