= Malawi at the Paralympics =

- IPC code: MAW
- NPC: Malawi Paralympic Committee
- Medals: Gold 0 Silver 0 Bronze 0 Total 0

Summer appearances
- 2012; 2016; 2020; 2024

Malawi made its Paralympic Games début at the 2012 Summer Paralympics in London.

Malawi has never competed at the Winter Paralympics and never won any Paralympic medals.

== See also ==
- Malawi at the Olympics
