= 2000 USA Indoor Track and Field Championships =

- Dates: March 3–4
- Host city: Atlanta, Georgia, United States
- Venue: Georgia Dome
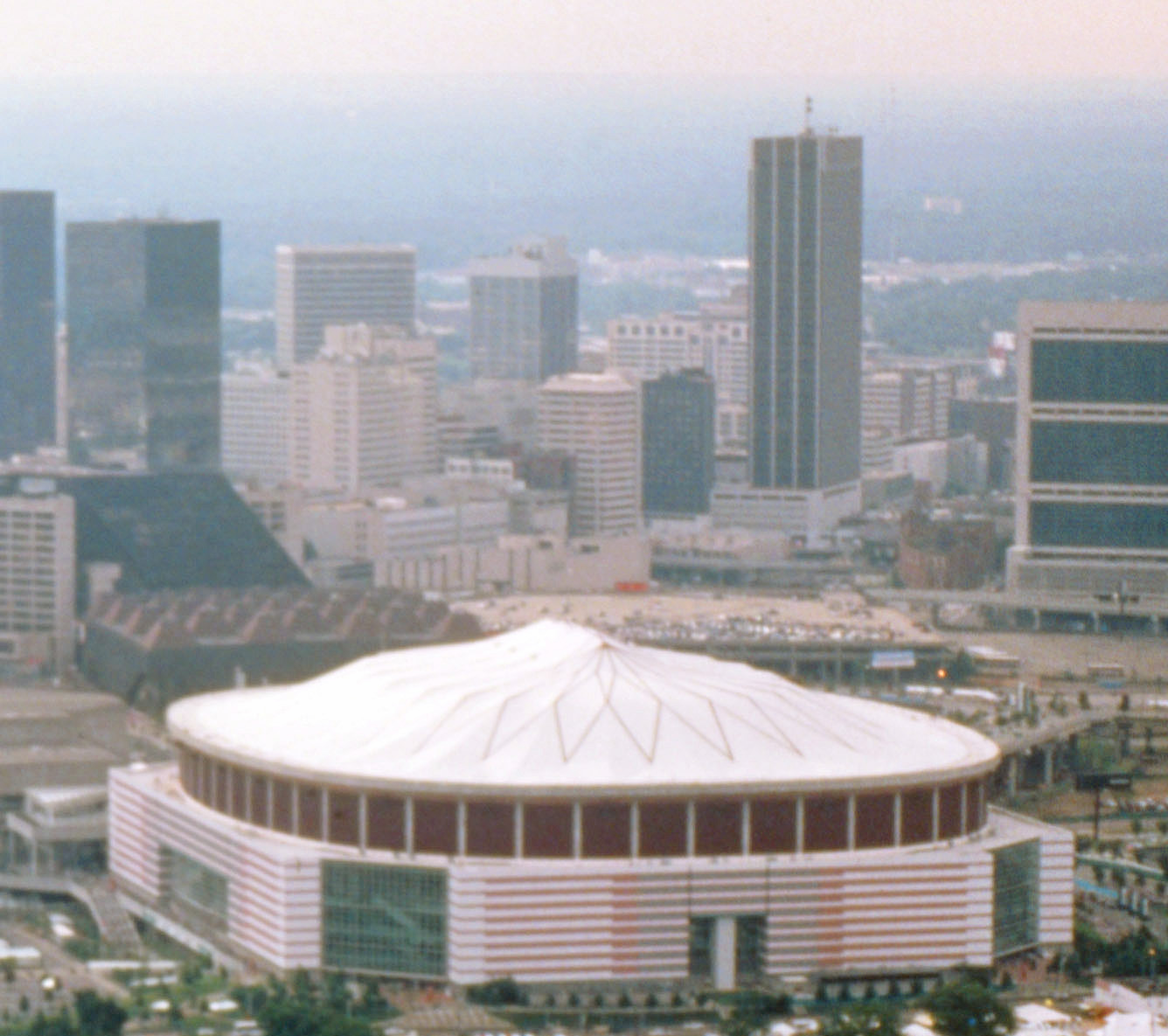
- Level: Senior
- Type: Indoor
- Events: 29 (15 men's + 14 women's)

The 2000 USA Indoor Track and Field Championships were held at the Georgia Dome in Atlanta, Georgia. Organized by USA Track and Field (USATF), the two-day competition took place March 3–4 and served as the national championships in indoor track and field for the United States. The championships in combined track and field events were held at a different time.

At the meeting, Stacy Dragila broke the world record in the women's pole vault indoors.

== Medal summary ==
=== Men ===
| Event | Gold | | Silver | Bronze |
|---|---|---|---|---|
| 60 m | Jon Drummond | 6.46 | | |
| 200 m | Chris Chandler | 20.84 | | |
| 400 m | James Davis | 45.54 | | |
| 800 m | Bryan Woodward | 1:48.69 | | |
| Mile run | Jason Pyrah | 3:57.83 | | |
| 3000 m | Ray Appenheimer | 7:56.22 | | |
| 60 m hurdles | Terrence Trammell | 7.57 | | |
| High jump | Matt Hemingway | 2.38 m | | |
| Pole vault | Lawrence Johnson | 5.81 m | | |
| Long jump | Savanté Stringfellow | 7.94 m | | |
| Triple jump | LeVar Anderson | 16.90 m | | |
| Shot put | Andy Bloom | 21.60 m | | |
| Weight throw | Lance Deal | 23.89 m | | |
| Heptathlon | Tom Pappas | 5933 pts | | |
| 5000 m walk | Tim Seaman | 19:32.11 | | |

=== Women ===
| Event | Gold | | Silver | Bronze |
|---|---|---|---|---|
| 60 m | Carlette Guidry | 7.12 | | |
| 200 m | Nanceen Parry | 22.65 | | |
| 400 m | Suziann Reid | 52.20 | | |
| 800 m | Hazel Clark | 2:03.40 | | |
| Mile run | Regina Jacobs | 4:25.92 | | |
| 3000 m | Marla Runyan | 9:01.29 | | |
| 60 m hurdles | Melissa Morrison | 7.86 | | |
| High jump | Tisha Waller | 1.96 m | | |
| Pole vault | Stacy Dragila | 4.62 m | | |
| Long jump | Adrien Sawyer | 6.54 m | | |
| Triple jump | Tiombe Hurd | 14.06 m | | |
| Shot put | Connie Price-Smith | 18.70 m | | |
| Weight throw | Dawn Ellerbe | 23.60 m | | |
| 3000 m walk | Michelle Rohl | 12:51.17 | | |
