= Ethiopia at the 2004 Summer Paralympics =

- IPC code: ETH
- NPC: Ethiopian Paralympic Committee

in Athens
- Competitors: 1 in 1 sport
- Flag bearer: Kiros Tekle
- Medals: Gold 0 Silver 0 Bronze 0 Total 0

Summer Paralympics appearances (overview)
- 1968; 1972; 1976; 1980; 1984–2000; 2004; 2008; 2012; 2016; 2020; 2024

Ethiopia competed at the 2004 Summer Paralympics in Athens, Greece. After a 20 years hiatus the country has made a comeback to the event.

== Sports ==
=== Athletics ===
==== Men's track ====
Athlete	Class	Event	Heats		Semifinal		Final	
Athlete	Class	Event	Result	Rank	Result	Rank	Result	Rank
Kiros Tekle	T46	100m	DNS		did not advance			
Kiros Tekle	T46	200m	24.39	12	did not advance			

== See also ==
- Ethiopia at the Paralympics
- Ethiopia at the 2004 Summer Olympics
