= Ethiopia at the 2020 Summer Paralympics =

- IPC code: ETH
- NPC: Ethiopian Paralympic Committee

in Tokyo
- Competitors: 3 in 1 sport
- Medals: Gold 1 Silver 0 Bronze 0 Total 1

Summer Paralympics appearances (overview)
- 1968; 1972; 1976; 1980; 1984–2000; 2004; 2008; 2012; 2016; 2020; 2024

Ethiopia competed at the 2020 Summer Paralympics in Tokyo, Japan, from 24 August to 5 September 2021.

== Medalists ==
Medal	Name	Sport	Event	Date
Gold	Tigist Gezahagn Menigstu	Athletics	Women's 1500 metres T13	28 August

== Competitors ==
The following is the list of number of competitors participating in the Games:

Sport	Men	Women	Total
Athletics	2	1	3

== Athletics ==
Men's track

Athlete	Event	Final	
Athlete	Event	Result	Rank
Tamiru Demisse	1500m T13	3:59.08	7
Gemechu Amenu Dinsa	1500m T46	3:56.04	5

Women's track

Athlete	Event	Final	
Athlete	Event	Result	Rank
Tigist Gezahagn Menigstu	1500m T13	4.23.24	1

== See also ==
- Ethiopia at the Paralympics
- Ethiopia at the 2020 Summer Olympics
