= Malawi at the 2024 Summer Paralympics =

- IPC code: MAW

in Paris, France August 28, 2024 – September 8, 2024
- Competitors: 2 (1 man and 1 woman) in 1 sport
- Flag bearers: Moses Misoya; Estere Nagoli
- Medals: Gold 0 Silver 0 Bronze 0 Total 0

Summer Paralympics appearances (overview)
- 2012; 2016; 2020; 2024

Malawi competed at the 2024 Summer Paralympics in Paris, France, from 28 August to 8 September 2024. This was the nation's fourth time competing at the Summer Paralympic Games after it made its debut at the 2012 Summer Paralympics. The delegation consisted of two competitors from one sport.

== Competitors ==
The following is the list of number of competitors in the Games.

Sport	Men	Women	Total
Athletics	1	1	2
Total	1	1	2

== Athletics ==
Athlete	Event	Heat		Final	
Athlete	Event	Result	Rank	Result	Rank
Estere Nagoli	Women's 200 metres T12	32.11	4	Did not advance	18
Moses Misoya	Men's 400 metres T13	—N/a		54.27	8

== See also ==
- Malawi at the 2024 Summer Olympics
- Malawi at the Paralympics
