= Athletics at the 2008 Summer Paralympics – Men's 5000 metres T46 =

The Men's 5,000m T46 had its Final held on September 13 at 10:05.

== Medalists ==
Gold	Abraham Cheruiyot Tarbei; Kenya
Silver	Mohamed Fouzai; Tunisia
Bronze	Mario Santillan; Mexico

== Results ==
Place	Athlete	Final
1	Abraham Cheruiyot Tarbei (KEN)	14:20.88 WR
2	Mohamed Fouzai (TUN)	14:38.96
3	Mario Santillan (MEX)	14:43.78
4	Tesfalem Gebru Kebede (ETH)	14:59.41
5	Remy Nikobimeze (BDI)	15:07.95
6	Pedro Meza (MEX)	15:25.26
7	Christoph Sommer (SUI)	15:28.19
8	Samir Chaabani (TUN)	15:28.30
9	Tito Sena (BRA)	15:32.32
10	Naohiro Ninomiya (JPN)	15:35.44
11	Michael Roeger (AUS)	15:36.95
12	Frederic van den Heede (BEL)	15:39.00
13	Ferej Mohammed Hibu (ETH)	16:17.62
	Moises Neto (BRA)	DNF
	Said Toumi (MAR)	DNF
