= Najah Chouaya =

Tunisian Paralympic athlete

Personal information
- Nationality: Tunisia
- Born: January 10, 1988 (age 38) Gabes, Tunisia

Sport
- Sport: Paralympic athletics
- Disability: Visual impairment
- Disability class: B3
- Coached by: Abdalah Machraoui
Medal record
Women's para athletics
Representing Tunisia
Paralympic Games
Silver medal – second place	2016 Rio de Janeiro	1500 m T13
World Para Athletics Championships
Bronze medal – third place	2017 London	1500 m T13

Najah Chouaya (born January 10, 1988) is a Tunisian runner and Paralympic athlete. She won a silver medal for Tunisia at the 2016 Summer Paralympics in the Women's 1500 metres - T13.

== Biography ==
Chouaya was born on January 10, 1988, in Gabes, Tunisia, with congenital blindness.

== Career ==
=== 2006 IPC Athletics World Championships ===
At the 2006 IPC Athletics World Championships in Assen, Chouaya participated in three events. On September 4, she competed the 200 metres in 27.12 seconds, placing sixth. On September 6, she came fourth in the 100 metres with a time of 13.42 seconds. Her final event was the 400 metre-race on September 8, where she placed eighth with a time of 59.92 seconds.

=== 2016 Paralympic Games ===
On September 10, 2016, Chouaya participated at the 2016 Summer Paralympics in Rio de Janeiro as one of thirty-one athletes competing for Tunisia. She came second in the Women's 1500 metres - T13 event, winning the silver medal with a time of 4:30.52. Chouaya was second to fellow Tunisian athlete Soumaya Bousaid, who won gold.

=== 2017 World Para Athletics Championships ===
On July 14, 2017, Chouaya competed at the 2017 World Para Athletics Championships in London in the Women's 1500 metres - T13. She won bronze with a time of 4:46.16, a season's best for her. She came behind Bousaid in second and Sanaa Benhama in first.
