= Malawi at the 2020 Summer Paralympics =

- IPC code: MAW
- NPC: Malawi Paralympic Committee

in Tokyo
- Competitors: 1 in 1 sport
- Medals: Gold - Silver - Bronze - Total

Summer appearances
- 2012 • 2016 • 2020 • 2024

Malawi competed at the 2020 Summer Paralympics in Tokyo, Japan, from 24 August to 5 September 2021.

== Athletics ==
Track

Athlete	Event	Heats		Final	
Athlete	Event	Result	Rank	Result	Rank
Taonele Banda	Women's 400 m T13				
Taonele Banda	Women's 1500 m T13	5:52.14 SB	7	Did not advance	

== See also ==
- Malawi at the 2020 Summer Olympics
