= 2012 Summer Paralympics medal table =

List of medals won by Paralympic delegations

2012 Summer Paralympics medals
- Location: London, Great Britain

Highlights
- Most gold medals: China (95)
- Most total medals: China (231)
- Medalling NPCs: 75

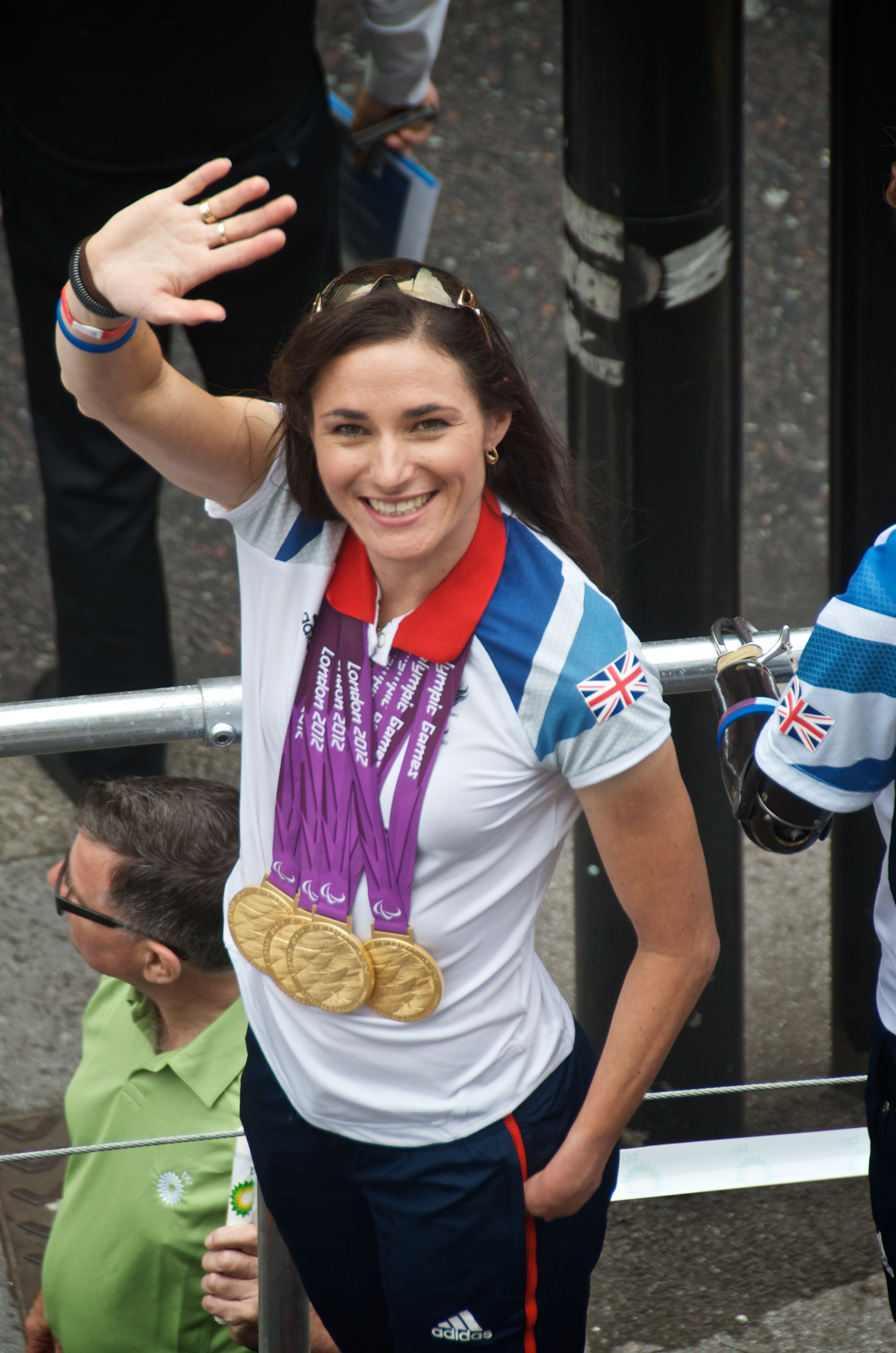
British cyclist Sarah Storey, pictured with her four 2012 Summer Paralympics gold medals

The medal table of the 2012 Summer Paralympics ranks the participating National Paralympic Committees (NPCs) by the number of gold medals won by their athletes during the competition. The 2012 Paralympics was the fourteenth Games to be held, a quadrennial competition open to athletes with physical and intellectual disabilities. The games were held in London, United Kingdom, from 29 August to 9 September 2012.

Some 4,280 athletes, representing 164 National Paralympic Committees (NPCs), competed in 503 events in 20 sports. This was the highest number of athletes and NPCs ever competing at a Paralympic Games. The medals were designed by Lin Cheung and show a representation of the wing of the Greek goddess Nike taken directly from a statue held by the British Museum. The engraving on the medals was conducted by the Royal Mint.

Athletes from 57 NPCs won at least one gold medal, with a total of 75 having won at least one medal of any colour. Athletes from Chile, Ethiopia, Fiji, Sri Lanka, and Uzbekistan won their first Paralympic medals. Of those nations, the National Olympic Committee of Fiji had never won an Olympic medal until 2016. China topped the medal table with 231 medals in total, including 95 gold medals. Host Great Britain placed third with 120 medals, including 34 golds. The most successful athlete at the Games was Australian swimmer Jacqueline Freney, who won eight gold medals. The most successful athletes outside the swimming competition were Raymond Martin from the United States and David Weir from Great Britain, who both won four gold medals each in athletics, and Sarah Storey from Great Britain, who won four gold medals in cycling.

== Medal table ==
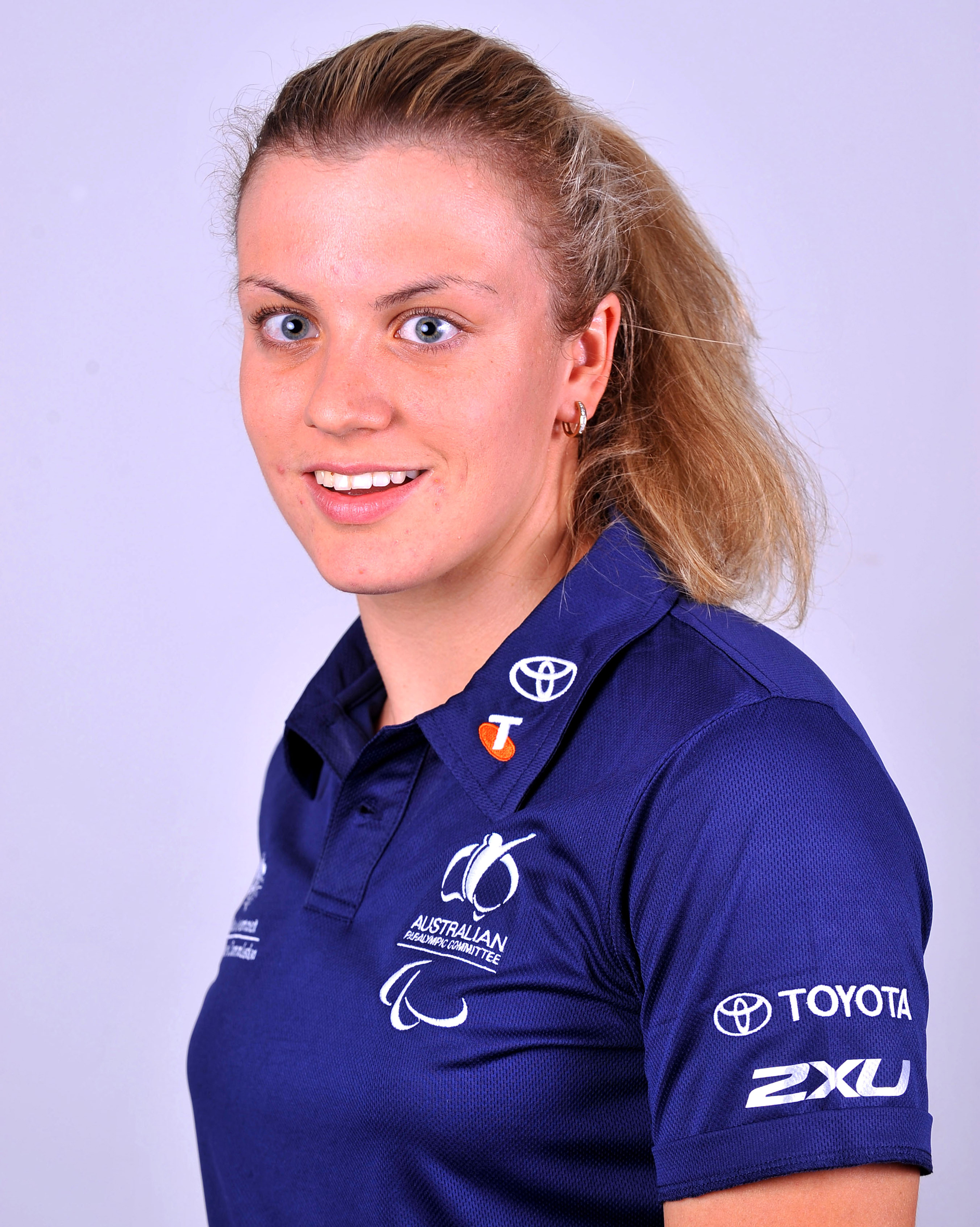
Australian swimmer Jacqueline Freney was the most successful athlete at the 2012 Paralympics.

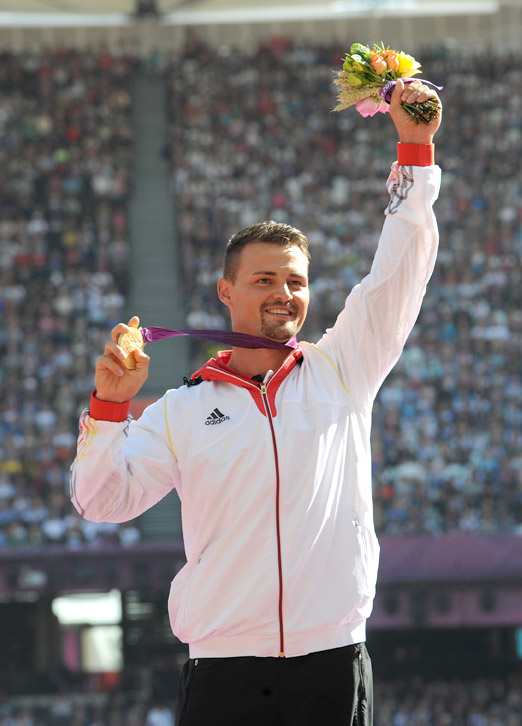
German T42 sprinter Heinrich Popow holding his gold medal aloft whilst standing on the podium

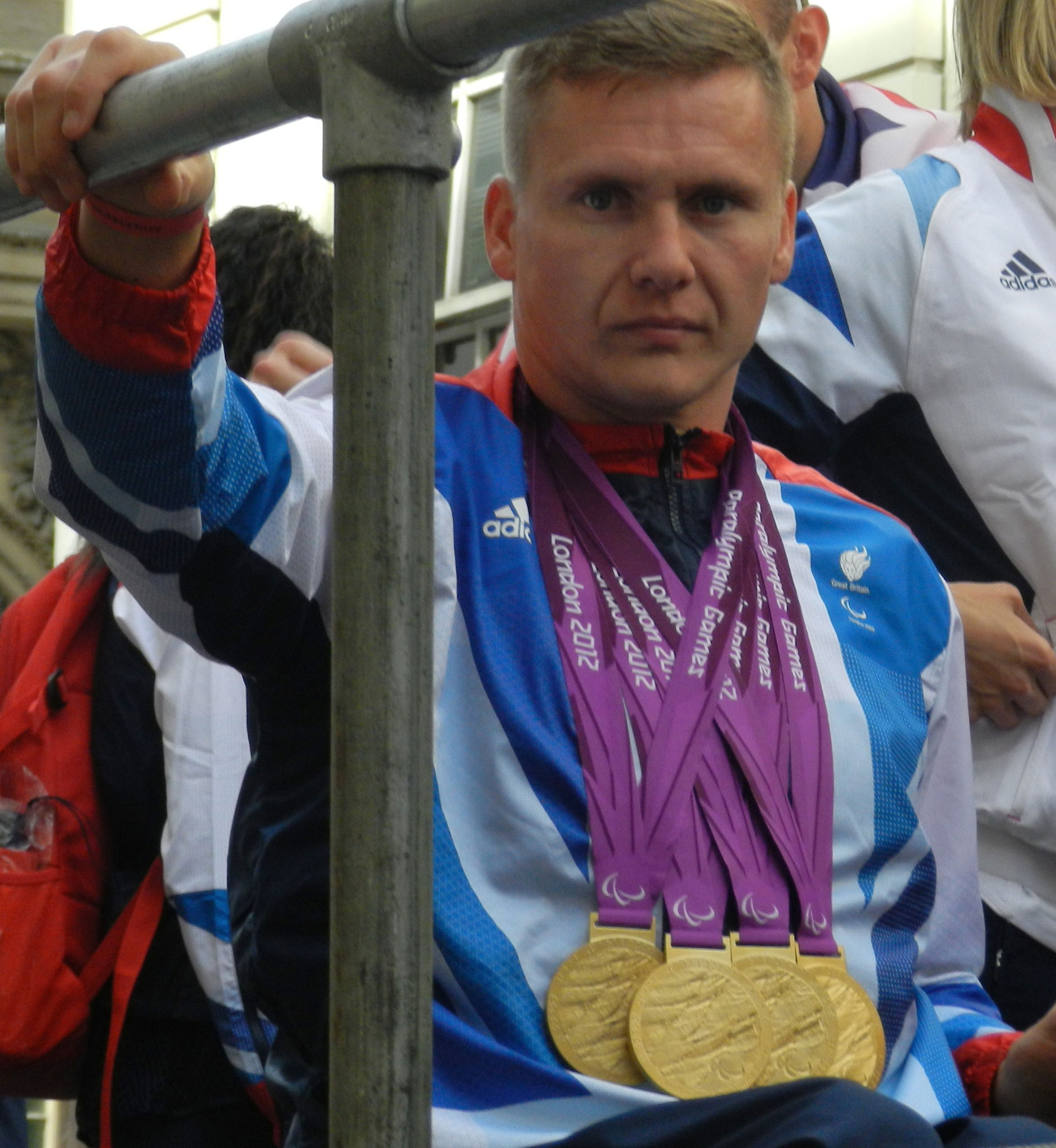
David Weir was one of the most successful wheelchair racers, winning four gold medals for Great Britain.

The ranking in this table is based on information provided by the International Paralympic Committee (IPC) and is consistent with IPC convention in its published medal tables. By default, the table is ordered by the number of gold medals the athletes from a nation have won (in this context, a nation is an entity represented by a National Paralympic Committee). The number of silver medals is next considered, followed by the number of bronze medals. If nations remain tied, they are ranked equally and listed alphabetically by IPC country code.

In the judo competition, an additional thirteen bronze medals were awarded as the winners of the two repechage brackets (for those who lost to the eventual finalists) each received a bronze medal.

* Host nation (Host nation (Great Britain))

2012 Summer Paralympics medal table
Rank	NPC	Gold	Silver	Bronze	Total
1	China (CHN)	95	71	65	231
2	Russia (RUS)	36	38	28	102
3	Great Britain (GBR)*	34	43	43	120
4	Ukraine (UKR)	32	24	28	84
5	Australia (AUS)	32	23	30	85
6	United States (USA)	31	29	38	98
7	Brazil (BRA)	21	14	8	43
8	Germany (GER)	18	26	22	66
9	Poland (POL)	14	13	9	36
10	Netherlands (NED)	10	10	19	39
11	Iran (IRI)	10	7	7	24
12	South Korea (KOR)	9	9	9	27
13	Italy (ITA)	9	8	11	28
14	Tunisia (TUN)	9	5	5	19
15	Cuba (CUB)	9	5	3	17
16	France (FRA)	8	19	18	45
17	Spain (ESP)	8	18	16	42
18	South Africa (RSA)	8	12	9	29
19	Ireland (IRL)	8	3	5	16
20	Canada (CAN)	7	15	9	31
21	New Zealand (NZL)	6	7	4	17
22	Nigeria (NGR)	6	5	2	13
23	Mexico (MEX)	6	4	11	21
24	Japan (JPN)	5	5	6	16
25	Belarus (BLR)	5	2	3	10
26	Algeria (ALG)	4	6	9	19
27	Azerbaijan (AZE)	4	5	3	12
28	Egypt (EGY)	4	4	7	15
29	Sweden (SWE)	4	4	4	12
30	Austria (AUT)	4	3	6	13
31	Thailand (THA)	4	2	2	8
32	Finland (FIN)	4	1	1	6
33	Switzerland (SUI)	3	6	4	13
34	Hong Kong (HKG)	3	3	6	12
35	Norway (NOR)	3	2	3	8
36	Belgium (BEL)	3	1	3	7
37	Morocco (MAR)	3	0	3	6
38	Hungary (HUN)	2	6	6	14
39	Serbia (SRB)	2	3	0	5
40	Kenya (KEN)	2	2	2	6
41	Slovakia (SVK)	2	1	3	6
42	Czech Republic (CZE)	1	6	4	11
43	Turkey (TUR)	1	5	4	10
44	Greece (GRE)	1	3	8	12
45	Israel (ISR)	1	2	5	8
46	United Arab Emirates (UAE)	1	1	1	3
47	Latvia (LAT)	1	1	0	2
47	Namibia (NAM)	1	1	0	2
47	Romania (ROU)	1	1	0	2
50	Denmark (DEN)	1	0	4	5
51	Angola (ANG)	1	0	1	2
52	Bosnia and Herzegovina (BIH)	1	0	0	1
52	Chile (CHI)	1	0	0	1
52	Fiji (FIJ)	1	0	0	1
52	Iceland (ISL)	1	0	0	1
52	Jamaica (JAM)	1	0	0	1
52	Macedonia (MKD)	1	0	0	1
58	Croatia (CRO)	0	2	3	5
59	Bulgaria (BUL)	0	2	1	3
59	Iraq (IRQ)	0	2	1	3
61	Colombia (COL)	0	2	0	2
62	Argentina (ARG)	0	1	4	5
63	Chinese Taipei (TPE)	0	1	2	3
63	Portugal (POR)	0	1	2	3
65	Malaysia (MAS)	0	1	1	2
65	Singapore (SIN)	0	1	1	2
67	Cyprus (CYP)	0	1	0	1
67	Ethiopia (ETH)	0	1	0	1
67	India (IND)	0	1	0	1
67	Saudi Arabia (KSA)	0	1	0	1
67	Slovenia (SLO)	0	1	0	1
67	Uzbekistan (UZB)	0	1	0	1
73	Venezuela (VEN)	0	0	2	2
74	Indonesia (INA)	0	0	1	1
74	Sri Lanka (SRI)	0	0	1	1
Totals (75 entries)		503	503	516	1,522

== See also ==
- 2012 Summer Olympics medal table
