= Ethiopia at the 1980 Summer Paralympics =

- IPC code: ETH
- NPC: Ethiopian Paralympic Committee

in Arnhem
- Competitors: 1 in 1 sport
- Medals: Gold 0 Silver 0 Bronze 0 Total 0

Summer Paralympics appearances (overview)
- 1968; 1972; 1976; 1980; 1984–2000; 2004; 2008; 2012; 2016; 2020; 2024

Ethiopia competed at the 1980 Summer Paralympics in Arnhem, Netherlands. 1 competitor from Ethiopia won no medals and so did not place in the medal table.

== See also ==
- Ethiopia at the Paralympics
- Ethiopia at the 1980 Summer Olympics
