= Ethiopia at the 2008 Summer Paralympics =

- IPC code: ETH
- NPC: Ethiopian Paralympic Committee

in Beijing
- Competitors: 2 in 1 sport
- Flag bearer: Tesfalem Gebru
- Medals: Gold 0 Silver 0 Bronze 0 Total 0

Summer Paralympics appearances (overview)
- 1968; 1972; 1976; 1980; 1984–2000; 2004; 2008; 2012; 2016; 2020; 2024

Ethiopia sent a delegation to compete at the 2008 Summer Paralympics in Beijing, People's Republic of China.

== Athletics ==
Athlete	Class	Event	Heats		Final	
Athlete	Class	Event	Result	Rank	Result	Rank
Tesfalem Gebru	T46	1500m	4:08.47	4 Q	3:55.41	5
Tesfalem Gebru	T46	5000m	—		14:59.41	4
Ferej Hibu	T46	1500m	4:11.22	11 q	4:16.74	10
Ferej Hibu	T46	5000m	—		16:17.62	13

== See also ==
- Ethiopia at the Paralympics
- Ethiopia at the 2008 Summer Olympics
