= Ethiopia at the 2024 Summer Paralympics =

2024 sporting event delegation in Paris

- Flag of Ethiopia
- IPC code: ETH
- NPC: Ethiopian Paralympic Committee

in Paris, France August 28, 2024 – September 8, 2024
- Competitors: 4 (2 men and 2 women) in 1 sport
- Flag bearers: Yayesh Gate Tesfaw; Yitayal Silesh Yigzaw
- Medals Ranked 44th: Gold 2 Silver 1 Bronze 0 Total 3

Summer Paralympics appearances (overview)
- 1968; 1972; 1976; 1980; 1984–2000; 2004; 2008; 2012; 2016; 2020; 2024

Ethiopia competed at the 2024 Summer Paralympics in Paris, France, from 28 August to 8 September 2024.

== Medalists ==
Medal	Name	Sport	Event	Date
Gold	Tigist Gezahagn Menigstu	Athletics	Women's 1500 metres T13	31 August
Gold	Yayesh Gate Tesfaw	Athletics	Women's 1500 metres T11	2 September
Silver	Yitayal Silesh Yigzaw	Athletics	Men's 1500 metres T11	3 September

== Competitors ==
The following is the list of number of competitors in the Games, including game-eligible alternates in team sports.

Sport	Men	Women	Total
Athletics	2	2	4
Total	2	2	4

== Athletics ==
Key

- Note–Ranks given for track events are within the athlete's heat only
- Q = Qualified for the next round
- q = Qualified for the next round as a fastest loser or, in field events, by position without achieving the qualifying target
- DQ = Disqualified
- PR = Paralympic Record
- AR = Area (or continental) Record
- NR = National Record
- SB = Season's Best
- N/A = Round not applicable for the event
- Bye = Athlete not required to compete in round

Track & road events
Men

Athlete	Event	Heat		Final	
Athlete	Event	Result	Rank	Result	Rank
Yitayal Silesh Yigzaw	Men's 1500 m T11	4:06.11	2 Q	4:03.21	2nd place, silver medalist(s)
Gemechu Amenu Dinsa	Men's 1500 m T46	—		3:59.05	7

Women

Athlete	Event	Heat		Semifinal		Final
Athlete	Event	Result	Rank	Result	Rank	
Tigist Gezahagn	Women's 1500 m T13	—		4:22.39	1st place, gold medalist(s)	
Yayesh Gate Tesfaw	Women's 1500 m T11	4:46.34	1 Q	4:27.68	1st place, gold medalist(s)	

== See also ==
- Ethiopia at the 2024 Summer Olympics
- Ethiopia at the Paralympics
