= Ethiopia at the 1976 Summer Paralympics =

- IPC code: ETH
- NPC: Ethiopian Paralympic Committee

in Toronto
- Competitors: 1
- Medals Ranked 34th: Gold 0 Silver 0 Bronze 0 Total 0

Summer Paralympics appearances (overview)
- 1968; 1972; 1976; 1980; 1984–2000; 2004; 2008; 2012; 2016; 2020; 2024

Ethiopia sent a delegation to compete at the 1976 Summer Paralympics in Toronto, Ontario, Canada. Its athletes failed in winning any medal and finished last along 7 other countries.

== See also ==
- 1976 Summer Paralympics
