= Ethiopia at the 2016 Summer Paralympics =

- IPC code: ETH
- NPC: Ethiopian Paralympic Committee

in Rio de Janeiro
- Competitors: 5 in 1 sports
- Flag bearer: Tamiru Demisse
- Medals Ranked 69th: Gold 0 Silver 1 Bronze 0 Total 1

Summer Paralympics appearances (overview)
- 1968; 1972; 1976; 1980; 1984–2000; 2004; 2008; 2012; 2016; 2020; 2024

Ethiopia competed at the 2016 Summer Paralympics in Rio de Janeiro, Brazil, from 7 September to 18 September 2016.

== Background ==
Ethiopian Paralympians had difficulty getting internal funding for their Paralympic efforts. Their national federation provided no money for equipment, and in the lead up to the Rio Games, most trained barefoot.

== Disability classifications ==
Every participant at the Paralympics has their disability grouped into one of five disability categories; amputation, the condition may be congenital or sustained through injury or illness; cerebral palsy; wheelchair athletes, there is often overlap between this and other categories; visual impairment, including blindness; Les autres, any physical disability that does not fall strictly under one of the other categories, for example dwarfism or multiple sclerosis. Each Paralympic sport then has its own classifications, dependent upon the specific physical demands of competition. Events are given a code, made of numbers and letters, describing the type of event and classification of the athletes competing. Some sports, such as athletics, divide athletes by both the category and severity of their disabilities, other sports, for example swimming, group competitors from different categories together, the only separation being based on the severity of the disability.

== Medallists ==
Ethiopia finished tied for ninth among African countries for total gold medals, winning one silver. Uganda and the Ivory Coast also won a single silver medal.

Medal	Name	Sport	Event	Date
Silver	Tamiru Demisse	Athletics	Men's 1500 m T12-13	11 September

== Athletics ==
One of the members of the Ethiopian delegation was Tamiru Demisse, who won silver in the 1,500 meters. Demisse hoped that following the Rio Games, one day he could represent the United States or Canada at the Paralympics.

Men's Track

Athlete	Events	Heat		Semifinal		Final	
Athlete	Events	Time	Rank	Time	Rank	Time	Rank
Megersa Bati	400 m T12	51.39	4	did not advance			
Tamiru Demisse	400 m T13	did not start		—N/a		did not advance	
Tamiru Demisse	1500 m T12-13	—N/a				3:48.49	2nd place, silver medalist(s)
Astbha Gebremeskel	1500 m T45-46	—N/a				4:15.01	9
Hailu Haile	1500 m T45-46	—N/a				4:06.37	6

Women's Track

Athlete	Events	Heat		Final	
Athlete	Events	Time	Rank	Time	Rank
Yengus Azenaw	200 m T45-47	Disqualified		did not advance	
Yengus Azenaw	400 m T45-47	Disqualified		did not advance	

== See also ==
- Ethiopia at the 2016 Summer Olympics
