= Meryem En-Nourhi =

Moroccan Paralympic athlete (born 1990)

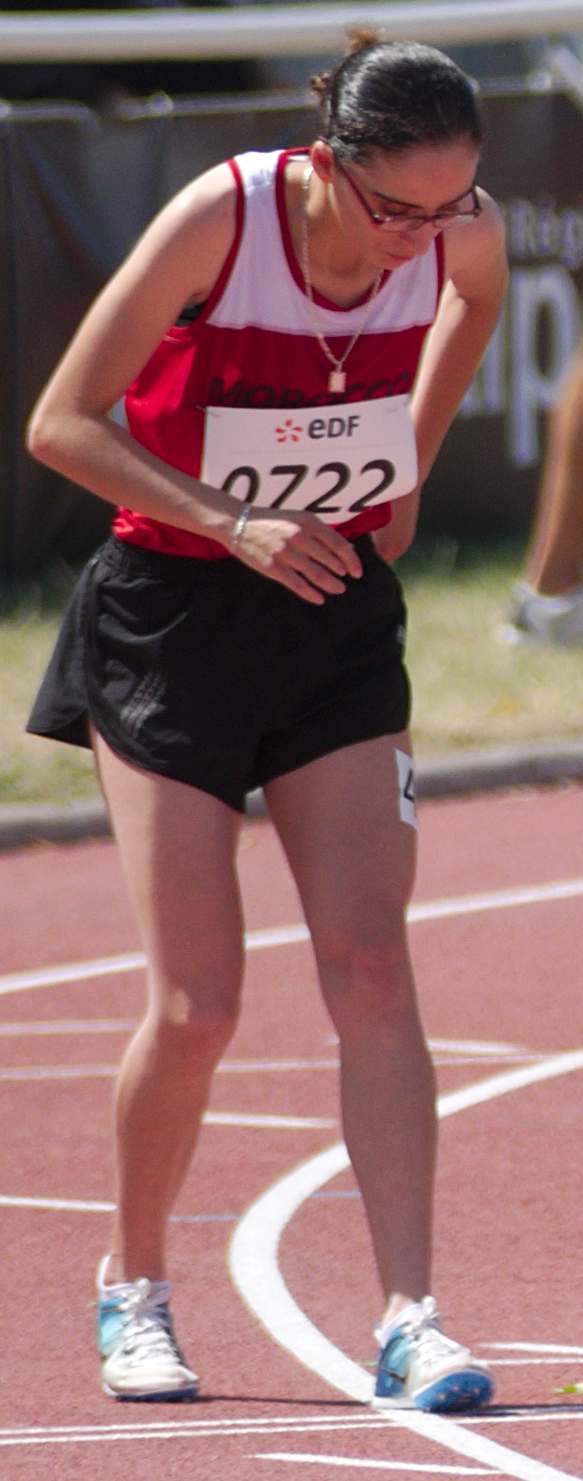
- En-Nourhi at the 2013 IPC Athletics World Championships

Personal information
- Born: 6 November 1990 (age 35) Morocco

Sport
- Sport: Paralympic athletics
- Disability class: T12
Medal record
Representing Morocco
Summer Paralympics
Silver medal – second place	2024 Paris	Marathon T12
World Championships
Silver medal – second place	2013 Lyon	1500m T12
Islamic Solidarity Games
Bronze medal – third place	2017 Baku	100 m T12
Bronze medal – third place	2017 Baku	200 m T12

Meryem En-Nourhi (born 6 November 1990) is a Moroccan Paralympic athlete who competes in international track and field competitions. She competed at the 2020 Summer Paralympics and also competed at the 2024 Summer Paralympics, where she won a silver medal.

== Career ==
In 2013, En-Nourhi competed in the 1500m T12 event at the 2013 IPC Athletics World Championships in Lyon, winning the silver medal. In 2017, she competed at the Islamic Solidarity Games, winning the bronze medal in the 100 m and 200 m events. En-Nourhi competed in two events at the 2020 Summer Paralympics, the 1500 m and the marathon. At the 2024 Summer Paralympics, she won the silver medal in the women's marathon T12.
