= Athletics at the 2024 Summer Paralympics – Women's 1500 metres T11 =

Women's 1500 metres T11 at the XVII Paralympic Games
- Venue: Stade de France
- Dates: 1 September 2024 (round 1); 2 September 2024 (final)
- Competitors: 13 from 11 nations
- Winning time: 4:27.68 WR

Medalists
1st place, gold medalist(s)		Yayesh Gate Tesfaw; Guide: Kindu Girma	Ethiopia
2nd place, silver medalist(s)		He Shanshan; Guide: You Junjie	China
3rd place, bronze medalist(s)		Louzanne Coetzee; Guide: Erasmus Badenhorst	South Africa

1500 metres at the 2024 Summer Paralympics
Men's · T11 · T13 · T20 · T38 · T46 · T54 · Women's · T11 · T13 · T20 · T54

The women's 1500 metres T11 event at the 2024 Summer Paralympics in Paris, took place on 1 and 2 September 2024.

The T11 category is for athletes with a visual impairment. A T11 athlete may be entirely without sight, or be able to perceive light, but have no ability to see the shape of a hand at any distance. T11 athletes commonly run with guides.

== Records ==
Prior to the competition, the existing records were as follows:

World Record	Yayesh Gate Tesfaw (ETH)	4:31.77	(Japan) Kobe	18 May 2024
Paralympic Record	Mónica Olivia Rodríguez (MEX)	4:37.40	(Japan) Tokyo	30 August 2021

Area	Time		Athlete	Location	Date
Africa	4:31.77	WR	(Ethiopia) Yayesh Gate Tesfaw	(Japan) Kobe	18 May 2024
America	4:37.40		(Mexico) Mónica Olivia Rodríguez	(Japan) Tokyo	30 August 2021
Asia	4:34.12		(China) He Shanshan	(Japan) Kobe	18 May 2024
Europe	4:48.74		(Poland) Joanna Mazur	(Japan) Tokyo	30 August 2021
Oceania	Vacant				

== Results ==
=== Round 1 ===
==== Heat 1 ====
Rank	Athlete	Nation	Time	Notes
1	Yayesh Gate Tesfaw; Guide: Kindu Girma	Ethiopia	4:46.34	Q
2	Mary Njoroge; Guide: James Boit	Kenya	4:50.42	q, SB
3	Neri Mamani; Guide: Aldo Cusi Huaman	Peru	4:59.74	PB
4	Irene Suárez Delgado; Guide: Victor Mendez	Venezuela	5:07.13	PB
5	Gulnaz Zhuzbaeva; Guide: Iuliia Fernias	Kyrgyzstan	6:11.36	PB

==== Heat 2 ====
Rank	Athlete	Nation	Time	Notes
1	Nancy Chelangat Koech; Guide: Geoffrey Rotich	Kenya	4:55.24	Q, SB
2	Joanna Mazur; Guide: Michal Stawicki	Poland	4:56.30	q
3	Mónica Olivia Rodríguez; Guide: Pablo Rodriguez Comparan	Mexico	5:00.23	SB
4	Camila Muller; Guide: Marcos Silva dos Santos	Brazil	5:03.01	PB

==== Heat 3 ====
Rank	Athlete	Nation	Time	Notes
1	He Shanshan; Guide: You Junjie	China	4:44.66	Q
2	Louzanne Coetzee; Guide: Erasmus Badenhorst	South Africa	4:45.25	q, SB
3	Priscah Jepkemei; Guide: Kenneth Lagat	Kenya	5:03.11	
4	Rakshitha Raju; Guide: Rahul Balakrishna	India	5:29.92	

=== Final ===
Rank	Athlete	Nation	Time	Notes
1st place, gold medalist(s)	Yayesh Gate Tesfaw; Guide: Kindu Girma	Ethiopia	4:27.68	WR
2nd place, silver medalist(s)	He Shanshan; Guide: You Junjie	China	4:32.82	AR
3rd place, bronze medalist(s)	Louzanne Coetzee; Guide: Erasmus Badenhorst	South Africa	4:35.49	PB
4	Mary Njoroge; Guide: James Boit	Kenya	4:41.48	PB
5	Nancy Chelangat Koech; Guide: Geoffrey Rotich	Kenya	4:45.10	SB
6	Joanna Mazur; Guide: Michal Stawicki	Poland	4:59.71	
