= Grigoriy Andreyev =

Russian marathon runner

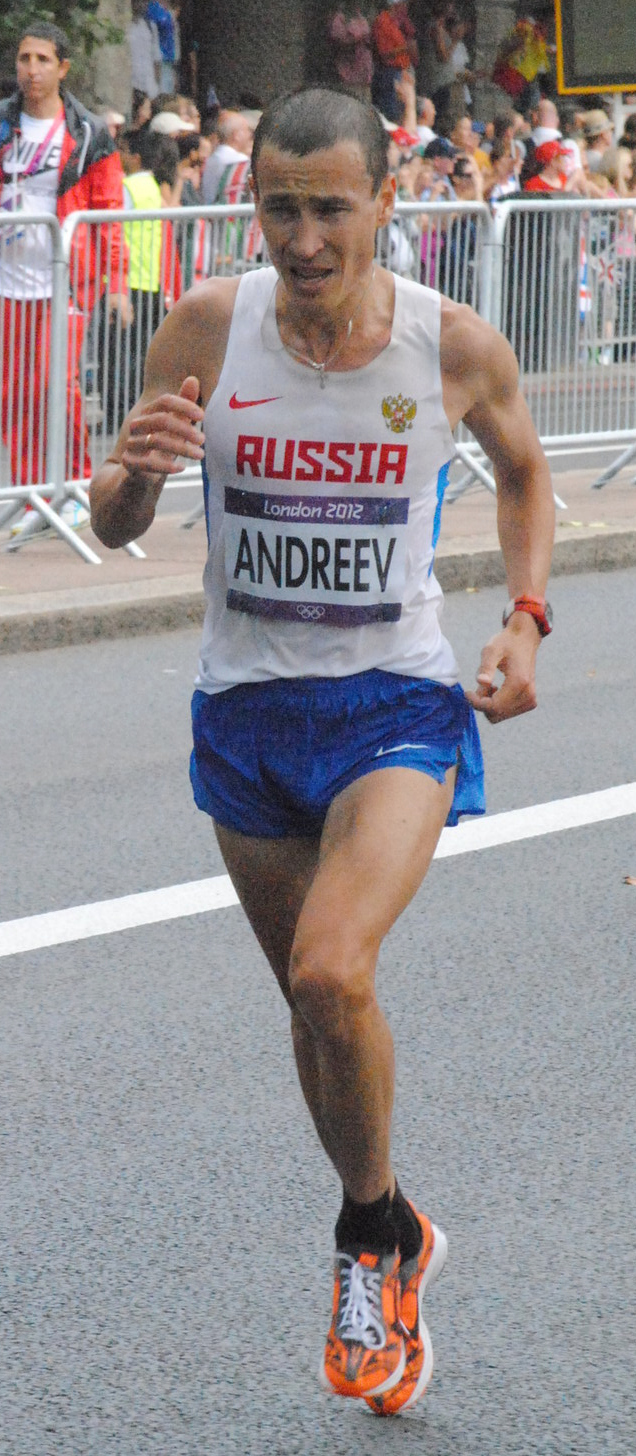
- Andreyev at the 2012 Olympics

Personal information
- Born: January 7, 1976 (age 50) Starokulchubayevo, Bashkortostan, Russian SFSR, Soviet Union
- Education: Bashkir State University
- Height: 1.80 m (5 ft 11 in)
- Weight: 70 kg (150 lb)

Sport
- Country: Russia
- Sport: Athletics
- Events: 5000 m, half marathon, marathon
- Club: Inzer

Achievements and titles
- Personal bests: 5000 m – 13:49.35 (2008); HM – 1:03:55 (2007); Mar – 2:10:25 (2011)

Grigoriy Aleksandrovich Andreyev (Russian: Григорий Александрович Андреев; born 7 January 1976) is a Russian marathon runner. He competed at the 2004, the 2008 and 2012 Olympics and finished 19th, 14th and 37th, respectively.

Andreyev coaches his wife, Iuliia Andreeva, who is a Kyrgyzstani Olympic marathon runner. They have one daughter.

== Achievements ==
Year	Competition	Venue	Position	Event	Notes
2003	Košice Peace Marathon	Košice, Slovakia	1st	Marathon	2:13:24
2004	Hamburg Marathon	Hamburg, Germany	6th	Marathon	2:11:53
2004	Olympic Games	Athens, Greece	19th	Marathon	2:16:55
2005	Nagano Marathon	Nagano, Japan	2nd	Marathon	2:11:20
2005	World Championships	Helsinki, Finland	46th	Marathon	2:23:50
2006	Nagano Marathon	Nagano, Japan	2nd	Marathon	2:11:19
2006	European Championships	Gothenburg, Sweden	17th	Marathon	2:16:36
2007	Nagano Marathon	Nagano, Japan	2nd	Marathon	2:13:32
2007	Frankfurt Marathon	Frankfurt, Germany	10th	Marathon	2:11:02
2008	Olympic Games	Beijing, PR China	14th	Marathon	2:13:33
2009	Boston Marathon	Boston, United States	12th	Marathon	2:16:17
2009	Twin Cities Marathon	Minneapolis, United States	5th	Marathon	2:13:59
