= Yayesh Gate Tesfaw =

Ethiopian Paralympic athlete

Personal information
- Full name: Yayesh Gate Tesfaw
- Nationality: Ethiopian
- Born: 28 February 1997 (age 29)

Sport
- Country: Ethiopia
- Sport: Para-athletics
- Disability class: T11
Medal record
Women's para-athletics
Representing Ethiopia
Summer Paralympics
Gold medal – first place	2024 Paris	1500 m T11

Yayesh Gate Tesfaw (born 28 February 1997) is an Ethiopian Paralympic athlete. She made her first Paralympic appearance representing Ethiopia at the 2024 Summer Paralympics. She won gold in the women's T11 1500m event at the 2024 Paris Paralympics.
