= Tamiru Demisse =

Ethiopian Paralympic athlete

Sport
- Country: Ethiopia
- Sport: Para-athletics
- Disability: Vision impairment
- Disability class: T13
- Event: Sprinting
Medal record
Summer Paralympics
Silver medal – second place	2016 Rio de Janeiro	1500 m T13

Tamiru Demisse is a visually impaired Ethiopian Paralympic athlete. He represented Ethiopia at the 2016 Summer Paralympics held in Rio de Janeiro, Brazil and he won the silver medal in the men's 1500 metres T13 event. In this event, all three runners finished with a faster time than Matthew Centrowitz Jr., the winner of the men's 1500 metres event at the 2016 Summer Olympics, who finished with a time of 3:50.00.

He was also one of the flag bearers during the opening ceremony of the 2016 Summer Paralympics.
