= Tunisia at the 2016 Summer Paralympics =

- IPC code: TUN
- NPC: Tunisian Paralympic Committee

in Rio de Janeiro
- Competitors: 31
- Flag bearer: Hania Aidi
- Medals Ranked 21st: Gold 7 Silver 6 Bronze 6 Total 19

Summer Paralympics appearances (overview)
- 1988; 1992; 1996; 2000; 2004; 2008; 2012; 2016; 2020; 2024

Tunisia competed at the 2016 Summer Paralympics in Rio de Janeiro, Brazil, from 7 September to 18 September 2016.

== Background ==
Tunisia finished the 2016 Games ranked third all time for total medals won by African countries, with 74 all time, of which 32 were gold, 28 silver and 14 bronze. They were ahead of fourth ranked Zimbabwe who had 23 gold, 26 silver and 20 bronze medals for a total of 69 medals. They were behind second ranked Egypt who had 143 total medals, 45 gold, 43 silver and 55 bronze.

Tunisia also finished number one in terms of total medals won by an African country in Rio. They won 19 total medals. Their total number of gold medals, 7, put them second in Africa, behind Nigeria with 8.

== Medalists ==
=== Gold medalists ===
Medal	Name	Sport	Event	Date
Gold	Raoua Tlili	Athletics	Women's shot put F41	9 September
Gold	Maroua Brahmi	Athletics	Women's club throw F31/32	9 September
Gold	Soumaya Bousaid	Athletics	Women's 1500 m T13	10 September
Gold	Abbes Saidi	Athletics	Men's 1500 m T38	10 September
Gold	Walid Ktila	Athletics	Men's 100 m T34	12 September
Gold	Raoua Tlili	Athletics	Women's discus throw F41	15 September
Gold	Maroua Brahmi	Athletics	Women's shot put F32	17 September

=== Silver medalists ===
Medal	Name	Sport	Event	Date
Silver	Samar Ben Koelleb	Athletics	Women's shot put F41	9 September
Silver	Hania Aidi	Athletics	Women's shot put F54	10 September
Silver	Najah Chouaya	Athletics	Woman's 1500 m T13	10 September
Silver	Rima Abdelli	Athletics	Woman's shot put F40	11 September
Silver	Hania Aidi	Athletics	Women's javelin throw F53/54	13 September
Silver	Walid Ktila	Athletics	Men's 800 metres T34	14 September

=== Bronze medalists ===
Medal	Name	Sport	Event	Date
Bronze	Fadhila Nafati	Athletics	Woman's shot put F54	10 September
Bronze	Yassine Gharbi	Athletics	Men's 400 m T54	12 September
Bronze	Neda Bahi	Athletics	Women's 400 m T37	13 September
Bronze	Bilel Aloui	Athletics	Men's 5000 m T13	15 September
Bronze	Fathia Amaimia	Athletics	Women's discus throw F41	15 September
Bronze	Smaali Bouaabid	Athletics	Men's shot put F40	16 September

== Athletics ==
Men
Track & road events

Athlete	Event	Heat		Final	
Athlete	Event	Result	Rank	Result	Rank
Walid Ktila	100 m	15.44	1 Q	15.14	1st place, gold medalist(s)
Walid Ktila	800 m	1:46.28	1 Q	1:40.31	2nd place, silver medalist(s)

== See also ==
- Tunisia at the 2016 Summer Olympics
