= Marla Runyan =

American track and field athlete (born 1969)

Personal information
- Full name: Marla Lee Runyan
- National team: United States
- Born: January 4, 1969 (age 57) Santa Maria, California, U.S.
- Education: San Diego State University; University of Northern Colorado; Syracuse University College of Law
- Height: 5 ft 7 in (170 cm)
- Spouse: Matt Longergan
- Children: 1

Sport
- College team: San Diego State Aztecs
- Coached by: Matt Lonergan

Achievements and titles
- Olympic finals: 2000; 1500 m, 8th
- Paralympic finals: 1992; Mixed Road Tandem Open Cycling, 5th
- World finals: 1999; 1500 m, 10th 2003; Half marathon, DNF
- Personal best(s): 1500 m: 4:02.95 (2002); 5000 m: 14:59.20 (2004)
Medal record
Women's athletics (track and field)
Representing the United States
Paralympic Games
Gold medal – first place	1992 Barcelona	100 m B3
Gold medal – first place	1992 Barcelona	200 m B3
Gold medal – first place	1992 Barcelona	400 m B3
Gold medal – first place	1992 Barcelona	Long Jump B3
Gold medal – first place	1996 Atlanta	Pentathlon P10-12
Silver medal – second place	1996 Atlanta	Shot Put F12
Pan American Games
Gold medal – first place	1999 Winnipeg	1500 m

Marla Lee Runyan (married name Lonergan; born January 4, 1969) is an American track and field athlete, road runner, and cyclist who is legally blind. She is a six-time Paralympic medalist in track and field, two-time Olympian in track and field, and Paralympian in para-cycling. She was the first legally blind athlete to compete in the Olympics and is the only American to compete in both the Olympics and Paralympics.

Runyan's accomplishments include competing at the 2000 and 2004 Summer Olympics, three back-to-back national titles in the 5,000 meters, and top American finishes at the 2002 New York, 2003 Boston, and 2004 Chicago marathons. She formerly held the American records in the 800m event of the heptathlon and 20k road race. She currently holds numerous para-athletics world and national records in sprint, long distance, and field events.

== Life and education ==
Runyan was born in Santa Maria, California. After graduating from Camarillo High School in 1987, she went on to study at San Diego State University, where she began competing in several sporting events: the heptathlon, 200-meter dash, high jump, shot put, 100-meter hurdles, long jump, javelin throw and the 800-meter run.

Runyan received a bachelors and masters degree from San Diego State University and a masters degree from the University of Northern Colorado, each in subjects pertaining to the education of deaf/blind children. In 2025, Runyan earned a Juris Doctor degree from Syracuse University Law School.

Runyan married Matt Lonegran in 2002 and had a daughter in 2005.

== Career ==
=== 1992: Paralympics ===
Runyan won four gold medals at the 1992 Summer Paralympics in the long jump and the 100, 200, and 400 meter races. She also placed fifth in the mixed road tandem open cycling event.

=== 1996: Olympic Trials and Paralympics ===
She attempted to qualify for the Olympics at the 1996 U. S. Olympic Trials, finishing 10th in the Heptathlon. While failing to qualify, she ran the 800 meters in 2:04.60, a heptathlon-800m American record.

At the 1996 Paralympics in Atlanta, she took silver in the shot put and gold in the pentathlon.

=== 1999: Pan American Games and World Championships ===
Her career as a world-class runner in able-bodied events began at the 1999 Pan American Games in Winnipeg, where she won Gold in the 1,500-meter race and was ranked second in the United States in that event in 1999 by Track and Field News.

She placed 10th in the 1,500-meter race at the 1999 World Championships in Athletics.

=== 2000: National indoor title and Olympics ===
She won 3,000-meter race at the 2000 USA Indoor Track and Field Championships.

She placed eighth in the 1,500-meter in the 2000 Sydney Olympics, making Runyan the first legally blind athlete to compete in the Olympics and the highest finish by an American woman in that event.

=== 2001-2004: National titles, Olympics, and marathon success ===
==== 5,000 meters ====
Runyan won the 5,000-meter race at the 2001 USA Outdoor Track and Field Championships, 2002 USA Outdoor Track and Field Championships, and 2003 USA Outdoor Track and Field Championships. She competed in the first round of the 5,000-meter run at the 2001 World Championships in Athletics. Runyan qualified for the 2004 Summer Olympic Games in the 5,000-meter by finishing second in the United States Olympic Trials (track and field).

==== Road running ====
Runyan set the American record in the 20K road race in 2003. She also won the national road 10k championship in 2002 and the national road 5k championship in 2002, 2003, and 2004.

==== Marathon ====
Runyan finished fifth as the top American at the 2002 New York City Marathon with a time of 2 hours, 27 minutes and 10 seconds to post the second-fastest debut time ever by an American woman.

"I just think it's pretty brave, Marla's very tough, really gutsy. She's been fighting all of her life, and it comes out in her running."

— Colleen De Reuck, Marathoner

She also had the top American finishes at the 2003 Boston Marathon and 2004 Chicago Marathon. She did not finish the 2003 IAAF World Half Marathon Championships.

=== 2006: Continued national success ===
Runyan was the 2006 20k road champion and USATF Running Circuit Champion.

=== Awards and recognition ===
She was the USATF "Runner of the Year" in 2002 and 2006.

== Records and personal bests ==
The following table reflects Runyan's personal bests (PB), national records (NR), and world records (WR) in para and non-para athletics competition. These results may differ in each category due to different certification requirements for para and non-para records.

Records and Personal Bests
Surface	Event	Result	Year	Type of record
Outdoor	High jump	1.80m	1995	Para Athletics T13 NR and WR
Outdoor	Long jump	5.88m	1995	Para Athletics T13 NR and WR
Outdoor	Javelin	35.62m	1996	Para Athletics T13 NR
Outdoor	Pentathlon	3,661 pts	1996	Para Athletics T13 NR and WR
Outdoor	Heptathlon - 800m	2:04.70	1996	Former NR
Outdoor	100 m hurdles	13.59*	1996	PB, not legal due to wind
Outdoor	200 m	24.45	1995	Para Athletics T13 NR
Outdoor	400 m	54.46	1996	Para Athletics T13 NR, former Para Athletics T13 WR
Outdoor	800 m	2:03.18	1999	Para Athletics T13 NR and WR
Outdoor	1500 m	4:05.27	1999	Para Athletics T13 NR and WR
Outdoor	1500 m	4:02.97	2002	PB
Outdoor	Mile	4:43.90	2001	PB
Outdoor	3000 m	8:39.36	2002	PB
Outdoor	5000 m	15:07.19	1999	Para Athletics T13 NR and WR
Outdoor	5000 m	14:59.20	2004	PB
Outdoor	10,000 m	32:11.92	2006	PB
Road	5K	15:24	2000	PB
Road	10K	31:46	2002	PB
Road	15K	48.43	2003	PB
Road	10-mile	53:37	2002	PB
Road	20K	1:05:52	2003	PB, former NR
Road	Half marathon	1:11:19	2002	PB
Road	Marathon	2:27:10*	2003	PB - not legal
Road	Marathon	2:28:33	2004	PB

== See also ==
- List of athletes who have competed in the Paralympics and Olympics
