= Taonere Banda =

Malawian middle-distance runner

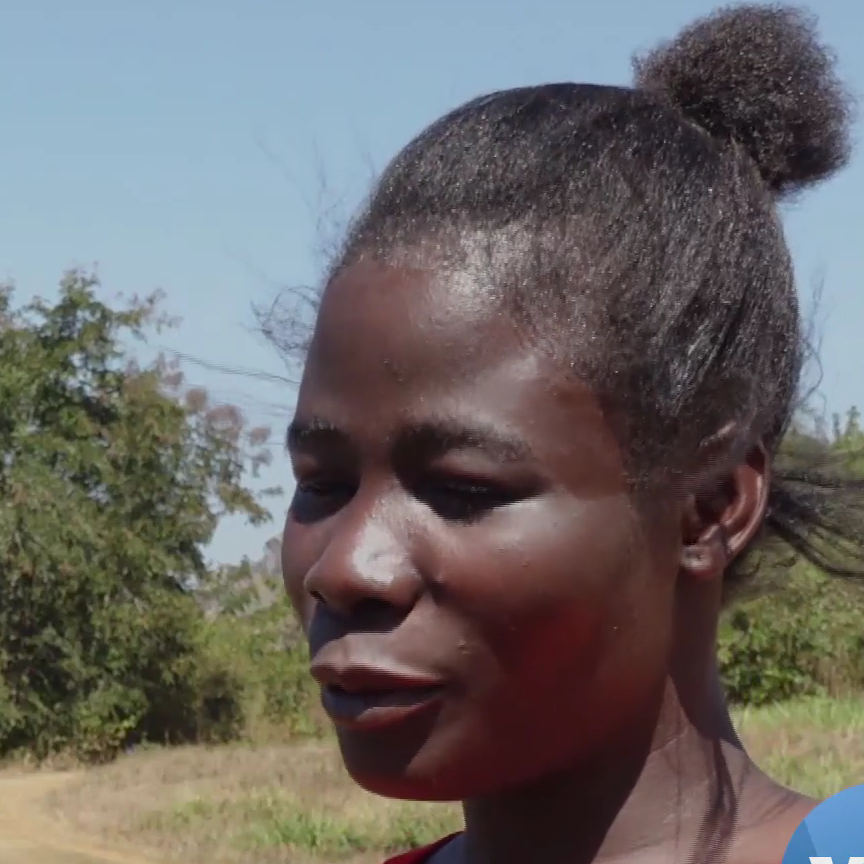

Personal information
- Born: 5 June 1996 (age 30) Malawi

Sport
- Country: Malawi
- Sport: Women's athletics
- Disability: Visual impairment
- Disability class: T13
- Event: 1,500m
- Club: Bello Athletics Club
- Coached by: George Luhanga

Achievements and titles
- Paralympic finals: 2016
Medal record
Women's athletics
Representing Malawi

Taonere Banda (born 5 June 1996) is a middle-distance para-sport athlete from Malawi who competes mainly in middle-distance events in the T13 category. In 2016 Banda became the first athlete to represent Malawi at a Paralympic Games when she was selected to compete at the 2016 Summer Paralympics in Rio de Janeiro.

== Personal history ==
Banda was born in Malawi in 1996. She was born with a visual impairment.

Banda, who is coached by George Luhanga, was classified as a T13 athlete prior to the 2012 Summer Paralympics in London. She qualified for the London Paralympics, but was unable to attend after last minute funding issues.

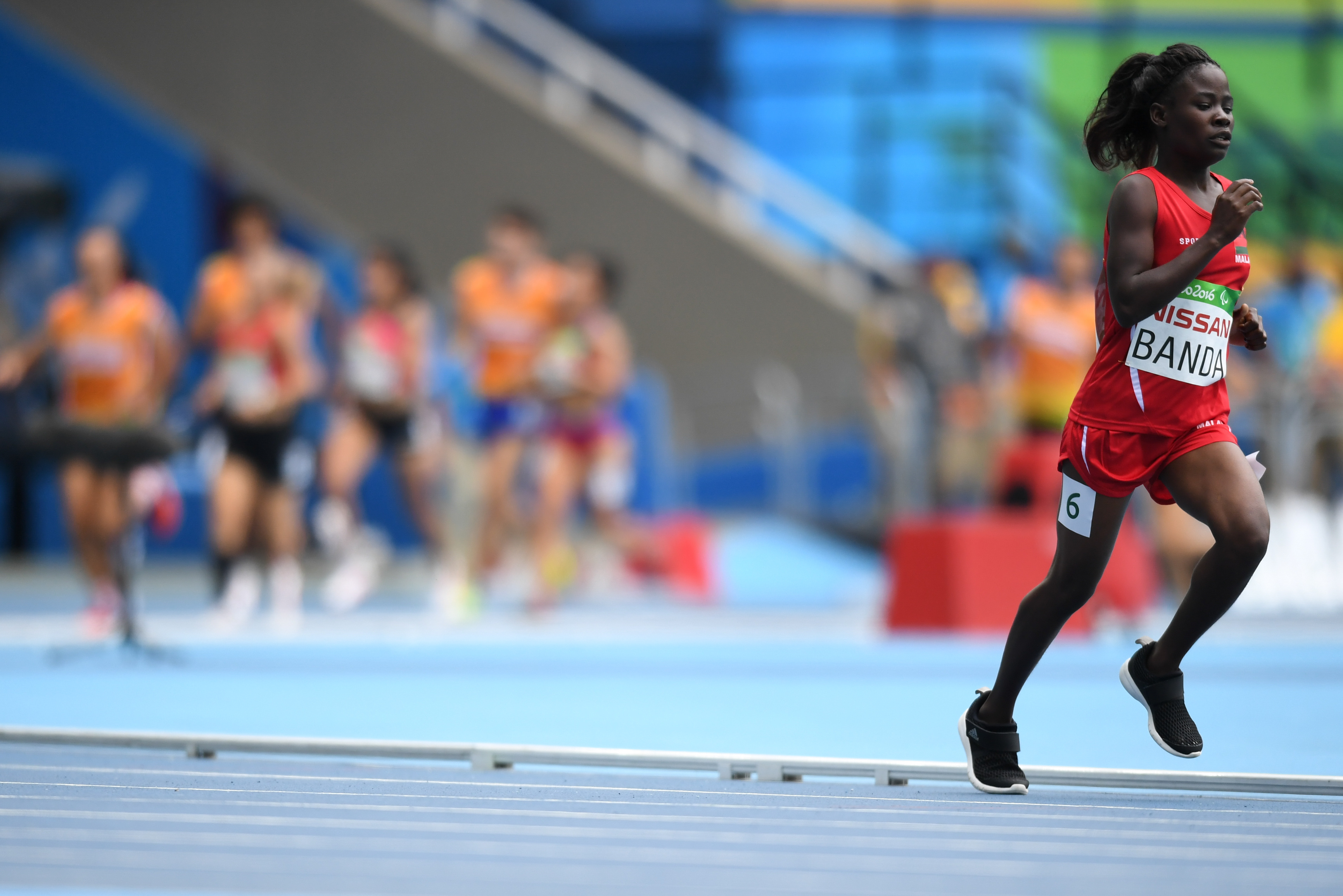
in Rio

Four years later she qualified for the 2016 Summer Paralympics in Rio, competing in the 1500 metres race (T13). In the buildup to the Games she had the opportunity to attend a training camp, and funding allowed her and her coach to travel to Brazil to become Malawi's first Paralympic athlete. The significance of her achievement was celebrated by the Malawi Paralympics Committee, who confirmed Banda's selection at a special event at the National Sports Council in Blantyre on 4 July 2016. She spent the 60 days in the buildup to Rio training for the event, but amenities in Malawi were imperfect and she trained on a dusty, uneven running track without standard defined lanes.

In Rio, Banda attended the opening ceremony, and as the sole representative of her country she took part as the flag-bearer. In the 1500 metre race at Rio, Banda was drawn in the first heat. She attacked the first lap aggressively taking up a commanding lead, but her initial speed saw her tire in the latter stages and she lost the lead in the last 600 metres of the race to finish fourth. Further disappointment was to follow for Banda when after the race she was disqualified from the race for leaving her lane.
