= Liza Corso =

American Paralympic athlete

Personal information
- Full name: Elizabeth Corso
- Born: July 10, 2003 (age 23)
- Home town: Newmarket, New Hampshire, U.S.

Sport
- Sport: Paralympic athletics
- Disability class: T13
- Event: Middle-distance running
Medal record
Track and field
Representing the United States
Paralympic Games
Silver medal – second place	2020 Tokyo	1500 m T13
Bronze medal – third place	2024 Paris	1500 m T13
World Championships
Silver medal – second place	2023 Paris	1500 m T13

Elizabeth Corso (born July 10, 2003) is an American Paralympic middle-distance runner. She represented the United States at the 2020 Summer Paralympics.

== Career ==
Corso represented the United States in the women's 1500 metres T13 event at the 2020 Summer Paralympics and won a silver medal. She ran for the Lipscomb Bisons track and field team beginning in 2022.

== Personal life ==
Corso was born with albinism and is legally blind with 20/200 vision.
