= Abraham Habte =

Eritrean long-distance runner

Abraham Habte (born 14 July 1996) is an Eritrean long-distance runner.

In age-specific competitions, he finished sixth (and won a team bronze medal) in the junior race at the 2015 World Cross Country Championships. He finished eighth in the steeplechase at the 2014 African Championships and eighth in the 10,000 metres at the 2016 African Championships.

His personal best times are 8:41.28 minutes in the steeplechase, achieved in June 2016 in Portland, Oregon; 13:30.98 minutes in the 5000 metres, achieved in July 2015 in Joensuu; 27:53.38 minutes in the 10,000 metres, achieved in May 2016 in Palo Alto; 1:02:17 hours in the half marathon, achieved in September 2015 in Copenhagen; and 2:11:56 hours in the marathon, achieved in December 2016 in Guangzhou.
