= He Shanshan =

Chinese Paralympic athlete (born 1999)

Personal information
- Born: 13 August 1999 (age 26)

Sport
- Sport: Paralympic athletics
Medal record
Representing China
Paralympic Games
Silver medal – second place	2024 Paris	1500 m T11
Bronze medal – third place	2024 Paris	400 m T11
World Championships
Silver medal – second place	2019 Dubai	1500m T11
Silver medal – second place	2024 Paris	1500m T11
Asian Para Games
Silver medal – second place	2022 Hangzhou	400m T11

He Shanshan (born 13 August 1999) is a Chinese Paralympic athlete who competes in international track and field competitions. She is a double World Para Athletics Championships silver medalist in middle-distance running.
