= Wondiye Fikre Indelbu =

Ethiopian Paralympic athlete

Wondiye Fikre Indelbu (born 13 February 1988) is a Paralympian athlete from Ethiopia competing mainly in category T46 middle distance events. He competed in the 2012 Summer Paralympics in London, England. There he won a silver medal in the men's 1500 meters - T46 event. This was Ethiopia's first Paralympics medal.
