= Izaskun Osés Ayúcar =

Spanish Paralympic athlete (born 1985)

Personal information
- Nickname: Kakun
- Born: 11 May 1984 (age 42) Pamplona, Spain
- Education: Public University of Navarra, Tudela, Spain
- Height: 1.69 m (5 ft 7 in)

Sport
- Country: Spain
- Sport: Paralympic athletics
- Disability: Glaucoma
- Disability class: T12
- Event(s): 400 metres 1500 metres
- Club: Grupo Empleo Pamplona Atletico
- Coached by: Jose Felix Navarro Ruiz
Medal record
Women's para athletics
Representing Spain
Paralympic Games
Bronze medal – third place	2016 Rio de Janeiro	1500 m T13
World Championships
Silver medal – second place	2025 New Delhi	1500 m T13
World Championships
Silver medal – second place	2016 Grosseto	400 m T12
Silver medal – second place	2016 Grosseto	1500 m T13
Silver medal – second place	2018 Berlin	1500 m T13

Izaskun Osés Ayúcar (born 11 May 1985) is a blind Spanish Paralympic athlete who competes in middle-distance running events in international level events. She is a bronze medalist at the 2016 Summer Paralympics.

== Personal life ==
Oses Ayucar received a nursing degree in the Public University of Navarra and was an intensive care nurse in Navarra Hospital but her eye condition worsened and she had to give up her job. She has mainly focussed on training since then.
