= Tigist Mengistu =

Ethiopian Paralympic athlete

Tigist Gezahagn
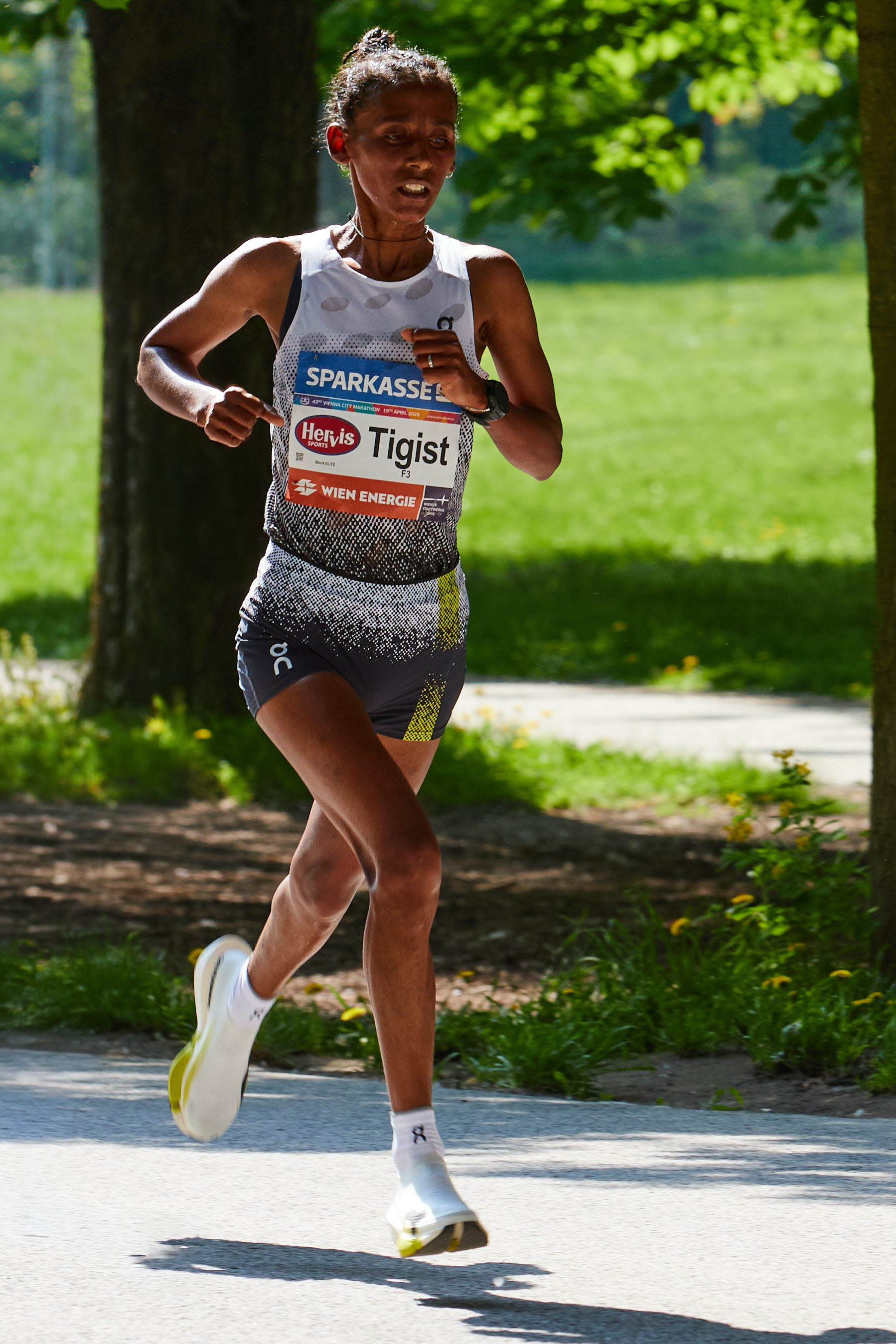
- Tigist Gezahagn Mengistu at the Vienna City Marathon 2026

Personal information
- Full name: Tigist Gezahagn Mengistu
- Nationality: Ethiopian
- Born: 12 March 2000 (age 26)

Sport
- Country: Ethiopia
- Sport: Para-athletics
- Disability class: T13
Medal record
Women's para-athletics
Representing Ethiopia
Summer Paralympics
Gold medal – first place	2020 Tokyo	1500 m T13
Gold medal – first place	2024 Paris	1500 m T13
World Championships
Gold medal – first place	2024 Kobe	1500 m T13

Tigist Gezahagn Mengistu (born 12 March 2000), also known as Tigist Gezahagn, is an Ethiopian Paralympic athlete. She made her first Paralympic appearance representing Ethiopia at the 2020 Summer Paralympics. During the 2020 Summer Paralympics, she created history by becoming the first ever gold medalist for Ethiopia in the history of Paralympics.

== Career ==
She won gold in the women's T13 1500m event at the 2020 Tokyo Paralympics. It was also Ethiopia's first ever gold medal at the Paralympics and her medal achievement was only the third Paralympic medal for Ethiopia with two other medals being silver.

On 19 April 2026 she won the Vienna City Marathon with the new (VCM-)record for women of 2:20:06 h.
