= Fatima Ezzahra El Idrissi =

Moroccan Paralympic athlete (born 1995)

Personal information
- Born: 19 July 1995 (age 30) Khemisset, Morocco

Sport
- Sport: Paralympic athletics
Medal record
Representing Morocco
Summer Paralympics
Gold medal – first place	2024 Paris	Marathon T12
Silver medal – second place	2024 Paris	1500 m T13
World Championships
Gold medal – first place	2019 Dubai	1500m T13
Gold medal – first place	2023 Paris	1500m T13
Silver medal – second place	2024 Kobe	1500m T13

Fatima Ezzahra El Idrissi (born 19 July 1995) is a Moroccan Paralympic athlete who competes in international track and field competitions. She is a World champion in middle-distance running. She competed at the 2020 Summer Paralympics and is qualified to compete at the 2024 Summer Paralympics. which she won gold medal.
