= Edneusa Dorta =

Brazilian Paralympic athlete (born 1976)

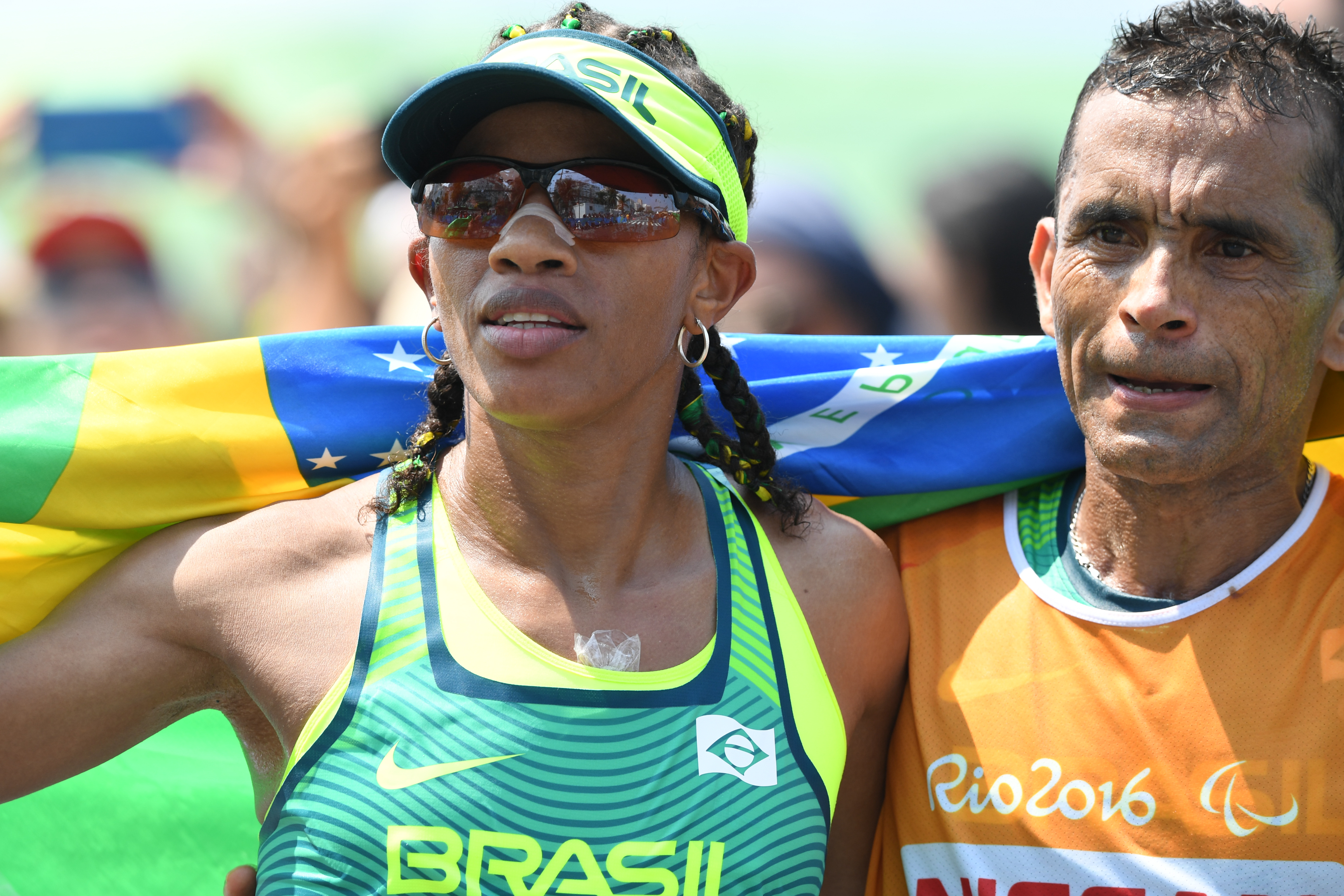
- Dorta (left) at 2016 Summer Paralympics

Personal information
- Full name: Edneusa de Jesus Santos Dorta
- Born: 28 July 1976 (age 49) Salvador, Bahia, Brazil

Sport
- Country: Brazil
- Sport: Para athletics
- Disability: Visual impairment
- Disability class: T12
- Event: Marathon
Medal record
Women's para athletics
Representing Brazil
Paralympic Games
Bronze medal – third place	2016 Rio de Janeiro	Marathon T12
World Para Marathon Championships
Silver medal – second place	2019 London	Marathon T12

Edneusa de Jesus Santos Dorta (born 28 July 1976) is a visually impaired Brazilian Paralympic athlete. She represented Brazil at the 2016 Summer Paralympics held in Rio de Janeiro, Brazil and she won the bronze medal in the women's marathon T12 event. She qualified for the 2020 Summer Paralympics, in women's marathon T12 and she was one of the ten competitors.

In 2019, she won the silver medal in the event for visually impaired athletes at the World Para Athletics Marathon Championships.
