= Francy Osorio =

Colombian Paralympic athlete

Personal information
- Full name: Francy Esther Osorio Calderón
- Born: 2 January 1983 (age 43) Bogotá, Colombia

Sport
- Country: Colombia
- Sport: Paralympic athletics
- Event: 1500 metres
Medal record
Paralympic athletics
Representing Colombia
World Championships
Silver medal – second place	2019 Dubai	1500m T13
Parapan American Games
Gold medal – first place	2023 Santiago	1500m T13
Silver medal – second place	2019 Lima	1500m T13

Francy Esther Osorio Calderón (born 2 January 1983) is a Colombian Paralympic athlete who competes in international track and field competitions, she competes in middle-distance running. She is a Parapan American Games champion and World silver medalist, she competed at the 2020 Summer Paralympics but did not medal.
