= Somaya Bousaid =

Tunisian Paralympic athlete (born 1980)

Medal record

Women's para athletics

Representing Tunisia

Paralympic Games
Gold medal – first place	2008 Beijing	800 metres – T12-13
Gold medal – first place	2008 Beijing	1500 metres – T13
Gold medal – first place	2016 Rio de Janeiro	1500 metres – T13
Silver medal – second place	2012 London	400 metres – T13
Bronze medal – third place	2020 Tokyo	1500 metres – T13

World Championships
Gold medal – first place	2015 Doha	1500m – T13
Silver medal – second place	2015 Doha	400m – T13
Silver medal – second place	2017 London	1500m – T13
Bronze medal – third place	2023 Paris	1500m – T13
Bronze medal – third place	2024 Kobe	1500m – T13

Somaya Bousaid (Arabic: سمية بوسعيد, born 5 May 1980) is a Tunisian Paralympian athlete competing mainly in category T13 middle-distance events.

== Career ==
She competed in the 2004 Summer Paralympics in Athens, Greece where she won the gold medal in the T12 1500m and a bronze medal in the T12 800m. She returned to the Paralympics in 2008 in Beijing, China winning the more bronze medals in the T13 1500m and the T12/13 800m.

Somaya competed in the 2012 Summer Paralympics in London, UK where she won a silver medal in the T13 400m.
