= Greta Streimikyte =

Irish Paralympic athlete

Personal information
- Born: 24 August 1995 (age 30) Vilnius, Lithuania

Sport
- Country: Ireland
- Sport: Paralympic athletics
- Disability: Retinopathy
- Disability class: T13
- Event: 1500 metres
- Club: Clonliffe Harriers Athletics Club
Medal record
Women's para athletics
Representing Ireland
World Championships
Gold medal – first place	2025 New Delhi	1500 m T13
European Championships
Gold medal – first place	2018 Berlin	1500 m T13
Gold medal – first place	2021 Bydgoszcz	1500 m T13
Bronze medal – third place	2016 Grosseto	1500 m T13

Greta Streimikyte (Lithuanian: Greta Štreimikytė [ʃt̪ɾɛɪ̯ˑmɪˈkʲiːtʲeː]; born 24 August 1995) is a blind Irish Paralympic athlete who competes in 1500 metres events in international level events. She moved to Ireland in 2010 and became an Irish citizen in 2015.

Streimikyte is one of a set of triplets, born prematurely and contracted retinopathy in an incubator at birth.
