= Deborah McFadden =

American politician

Deborah L. McFadden was appointed by President George H. W. Bush as U.S. Commissioner of Disabilities (1989–1993), and was instrumental in the writing and passage of the Americans with Disabilities Act of 1990. Having been paralyzed for a number of years as a young adult from Guillain–Barré syndrome, she was the highest-ranking female with a disability in the Bush Administration.

== Disability ==
Deborah was a healthy, top-of-her-class, straight-A student, and competitive fencer for the beginning of her life. However, at the age of 23, she began to feel exhausted and sought help from doctors, who diagnosed her with Guillain–Barré syndrome. The syndrome moved through her whole body; her immune system attacked her nerves, destroying any sense of feeling. Paralyzed from the neck down, she had to use an electric wheelchair for mobility.

== Accomplishments ==
As U.S. Commissioner of Disabilities, McFadden has consulted and worked with various heads of state and foreign governments, including King Fahd of Saudi Arabia, President Mircea Snegur of Moldova, and Pope John Paul II regarding the issues related to independence, productivity, and inclusion of people with disabilities.

In 1995, she founded the International Children's Alliance, a not-for-profit international adoption agency assisting in the placement and care of children from Russia, Ukraine, Bulgaria, Albania, China, Vietnam, India and other countries.

In 2006, she successfully sued the State of Maryland on behalf of her then teenage daughter Tatyana McFadden for inclusion of people with disabilities in sports in the Maryland school system, known as the Fitness and Athletics Equity for Students with Disabilities Act. She then drafted legislation, equivalent to Title IX, that is now a federal mandate and has improved the expectation of rights for American school children.

== Boards and foundations ==
McFadden has served on numerous boards and foundations including the Girl Scouts Woman's advisory board in Washington. D.C.; USA Track and Field, Chair of Para Sports; Mitsubishi Electric America Foundation; World Committee on Disabilities; Joint Council on International Children's Services. She is a founding member of Athletics for All, a nationwide organization that focuses on adapted sports and inclusion for students with disabilities.

== Family ==
She is the mother of three children all adopted from Russia and Albania, Tatyana (Russia), Hannah (Albania), both paralympic elite athletes, and Ruthie (Albania).
