= Tatyana McFadden =

American Paralympic athlete (born 1989)

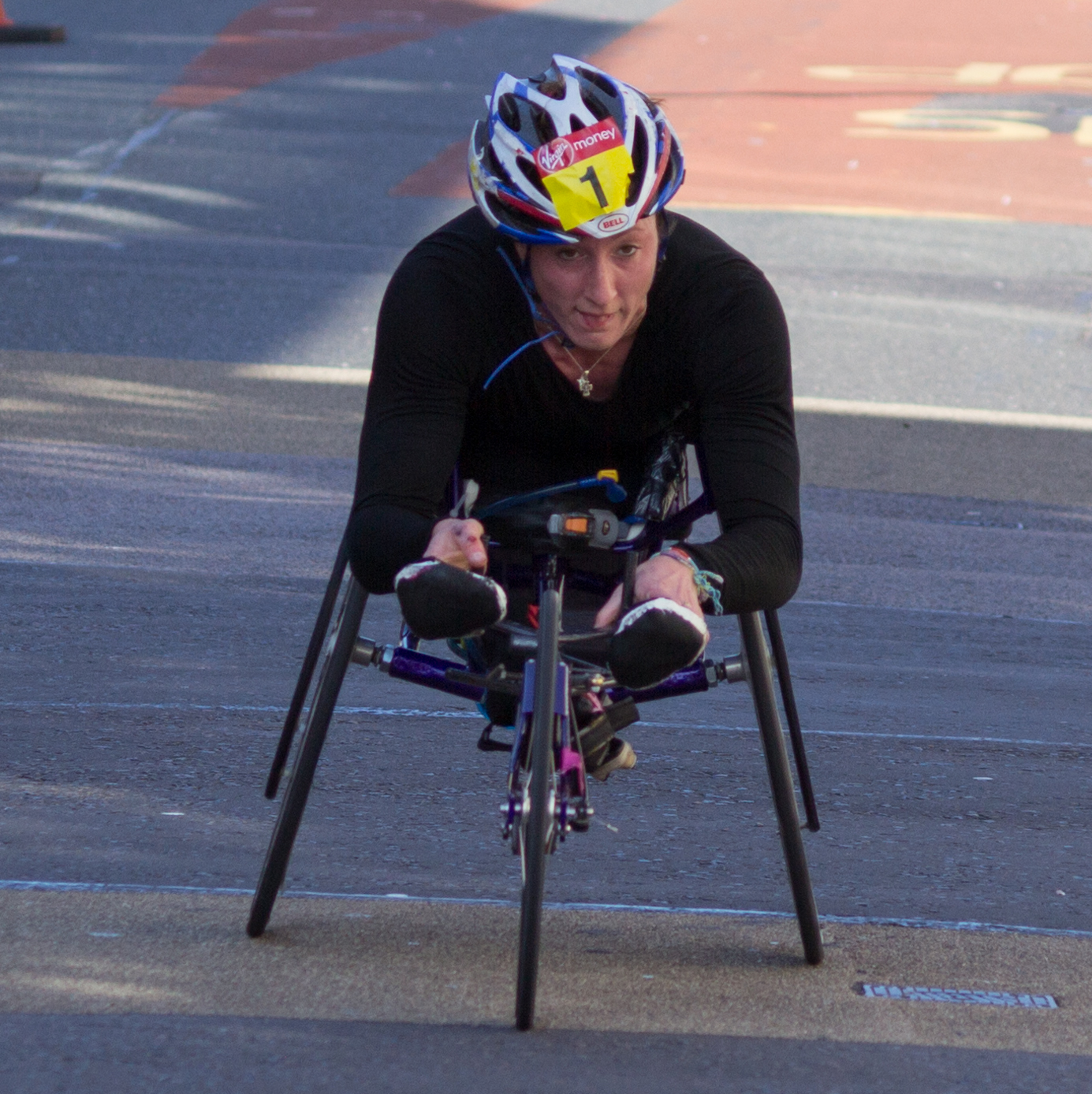
- Tatyana McFadden in London 2012

Personal information
- Nickname: Tatty
- Nationality: United States
- Born: April 21, 1989 (age 37) Leningrad, RSFSR, Soviet Union
- Home town: Clarksville, Maryland, U.S.

Sport
- Sport: Wheelchair Track and Field
- College team: University of Illinois Wheelchair Basketball and Wheelchair Track and Field teams
Medal record
Women's Track and field (T54)
Representing United States
Paralympic Games
Gold medal – first place	2016 Rio	400m – T54
Gold medal – first place	2016 Rio	800m – T54
Gold medal – first place	2016 Rio	1500m – T54
Gold medal – first place	2016 Rio	5000m – T54
Gold medal – first place	2012 London	400m – T54
Gold medal – first place	2012 London	800m – T54
Gold medal – first place	2012 London	1500m – T54
Gold medal – first place	2020 Tokyo	mixed 4 × 100 m relay
Silver medal – second place	2004 Athens	100m – T54
Silver medal – second place	2008 Beijing	200m – T54
Silver medal – second place	2008 Beijing	400m – T54
Silver medal – second place	2008 Beijing	800m – T54
Silver medal – second place	2016 Rio	100m – T54
Silver medal – second place	2016 Rio	Marathon – T54
Silver medal – second place	2020 Tokyo	800m – T54
Silver medal – second place	2024 Paris	100m – T54
Bronze medal – third place	2004 Athens	200m – T54
Bronze medal – third place	2008 Beijing	4 × 100 m – T53–54
Bronze medal – third place	2012 London	100m – T54
Bronze medal – third place	2020 Tokyo	5000 m T54
Bronze medal – third place	2024 Paris	mixed 4×100 m relay
World Championships
Gold medal – first place	2006 Assen	100m – T54
Gold medal – first place	2011 Christchurch	200m – T54
Gold medal – first place	2011 Christchurch	400m – T54
Gold medal – first place	2011 Christchurch	800m – T54
Gold medal – first place	2011 Christchurch	1500m – T54
Gold medal – first place	2013 Lyon	100m – T54
Gold medal – first place	2013 Lyon	200m – T54
Gold medal – first place	2013 Lyon	400m – T54
Gold medal – first place	2013 Lyon	800m – T54
Gold medal – first place	2013 Lyon	1500m – T54
Gold medal – first place	2013 Lyon	5000m – T54
Gold medal – first place	2017 London	200m – T54
Gold medal – first place	2017 London	1500m – T54
Silver medal – second place	2006 Assen	200m – T54
Silver medal – second place	2006 Assen	400m – T54
Silver medal – second place	2011 Christchurch	4 × 400 m – T53–54
Silver medal – second place	2023 Paris	400m – T54
Bronze medal – third place	2011 Christchurch	100m – T54
Bronze medal – third place	2023 Paris	100m – T54
Bronze medal – third place	2023 Paris	800m – T54
New York City Marathon
Gold medal – first place	2010 New York City	Marathon
Bronze medal – third place	2011 New York City	Marathon
Gold medal – first place	2013 New York City	Marathon
Gold medal – first place	2014 New York City	Marathon
Gold medal – first place	2015 New York City	Marathon
Gold medal – first place	2016 New York City	Marathon
Silver medal – second place	2017 New York City	Marathon
Silver medal – second place	2018 New York City	Marathon
Silver medal – second place	2019 New York City	Marathon
Silver medal – second place	2021 New York City	Marathon
Silver medal – second place	2025 New York	Marathon
Women's Paralympic cross-country skiing (Sitting)
Representing United States
Paralympic Games
Silver medal – second place	2014 Sochi	1km Sprint

Tatyana McFadden (born April 21, 1989) is an American Paralympic athlete competing in the category T54. McFadden has won twenty-two Paralympic medals across multiple Summer and Winter Paralympic Games. She also won the Laureus World Sportsperson of the Year with a Disability in 2015 and James E. Sullivan Award in 2025.

== Biography ==
McFadden was born in Leningrad, then Soviet Union, on April 21, 1989. She was born with spina bifida, a congenital disorder that paralyzed her from the waist down. After her birth mother abandoned her in an orphanage that was too poor to afford a wheelchair for her, she walked on her hands for the first six years of her life. The doctors told her she was so sick that she had very little time to live. While in the orphanage, she met Deborah McFadden, who was visiting Russia as a commissioner of disabilities for the U.S. Department of Health and Human Services. Deborah and her partner Bridget O'Shaughnessy adopted Tatyana and took her to live in Baltimore.

McFadden took up a variety of sports while growing up to strengthen her muscles: first swimming, then gymnastics, wheelchair basketball, sled hockey and track and field. McFadden attended the University of Illinois studying for a degree in Human Development and Family Studies, was a member of the Theta chapter of Phi Sigma Sigma, and was on the University of Illinois wheelchair basketball team.

== Competition ==
McFadden began racing at the age of eight. Competing in the 2004 Summer Paralympics in Athens, Greece, she won a silver medal in the women's 100 metres – T54 event; a bronze medal in the women's 200 metres – T54 event; finished fifth in the women's 400 metres – T54 event; and went out in the first round of the women's 800 metres – T54 event. She also competed at the 2008 Summer Paralympics in Beijing, China, where she won a silver medal in the women's 200 metres – T54 event; a silver medal in the women's 400 metres – T54 event; a silver medal in the women's 800 metres – T54 event; a bronze medal in the women's 4 × 100 metre relay – T53–54 event; and finished sixth in the women's 100 metres – T54 event.

Until 2009, McFadden specialized in shorter distance sprints. She entered the Chicago Marathon in 2009 as a lark. Unexpectedly, she won, finishing so soon that her mother didn't have her camera ready to record the victory. That was the first of a series of marathon victories for her, including New York City in 2010, Chicago in 2011, London in 2011, and Boston and New York in 2015.

McFadden's coach at the University of Illinois is Adam Bleakney, himself a veteran wheelchair racer.

Tatyana and her sister Hannah competed in the same Paralympic final (100m – T54 in London 2012).

McFadden became the first athlete to win six gold medals at a championships during the 2013 IPC Athletics World Championships in Lyon. She claimed gold in every event from the 100 meters through to the 5,000 meters. McFadden also won the Boston, Chicago, London, and New York marathons in 2013. This made her the first person – non-disabled or otherwise – to win the four major marathons in the same year. She also set a new course record for the Chicago Marathon (1 hour, 42 minutes, 35 seconds).

McFadden began 2014 by returning to the country of her birth, Russia, to compete in the Winter Paralympic Games in Sochi. After winning silver medal in the 1 km (0.6 mi) Sprint sitting cross-country skiing event; McFadden claimed she was "fulfilled" after winning the medal in front of all of her family including her biological mother. McFadden finished in 5th place in the Women's 12 km (7 mi). Just over a month after Sochi, McFadden returned to wheelchair racing at the London Marathon, where she successfully defended her title in a new course record time.

In 2015 McFadden won the NYC marathon, and broke its women's course record by seven minutes and 20 seconds (her time was 1 hour, 43 minutes and four seconds).

== Activism ==
McFadden had difficulty competing at high school. Atholton High School would not allow her to race at the same time as non-disabled runners, with officials saying her racing chair created a safety hazard and gave her an unfair advantage (as the best wheelchair racers are noticeably faster than runners over long distances). She competed in separate wheelchair events at high school meets, meaning that she would circle around an otherwise empty track by herself, which embarrassed her. In 2005 Tatyana and Deborah McFadden filed suit against the Howard County Public School System and won the right for her to race at the same time as the runners starting in 2006, though her score would not be counted for her team. However, her subsequent legal challenge to the new policy of disallowing her score as a violation of the federal Rehabilitation Act failed. The court did not grant the injunction she sought.

Her legal victory led to its own controversies, though. In 2006, one of her Atholton teammates lost her victory in the 1600 meters at the state championships after McFadden was ruled to have been acting as a "pacer" for her, by encouraging her rather than racing on her own. And in 2008, a rival runner and McFadden collided after a 200-meter race, causing the other runner her miss her conference title meet from the injuries.

McFadden's lawsuit is credited for the eventual passage of the Maryland Fitness and Athletics Equity for Students with Disabilities Act in 2008, which made Maryland the first state to require schools to provide equal physical education and athletic opportunities for students with disabilities. It is called Tatyana's Law. She was also a leader of an ultimately unsuccessful effort against a 2012 Russian law to prohibit adoptions of Russian children by American parents. She is featured in the 2020 documentary film Rising Phoenix.

== Achievements ==
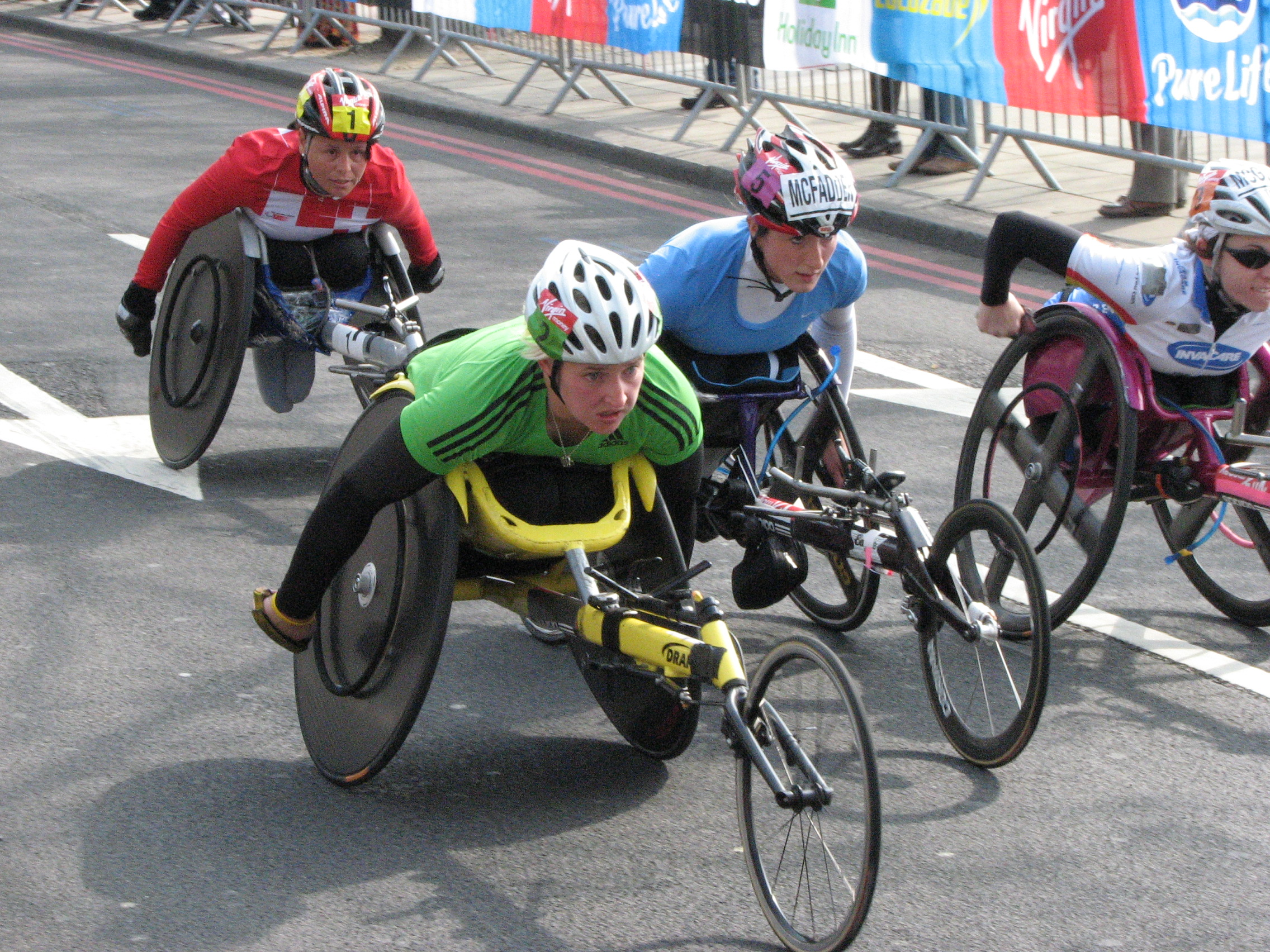
The women's wheelchair race at the 2011 London marathon (left to right: Sandra Graf, Shelly Woods, Tatyana McFadden, Amanda McGrory).

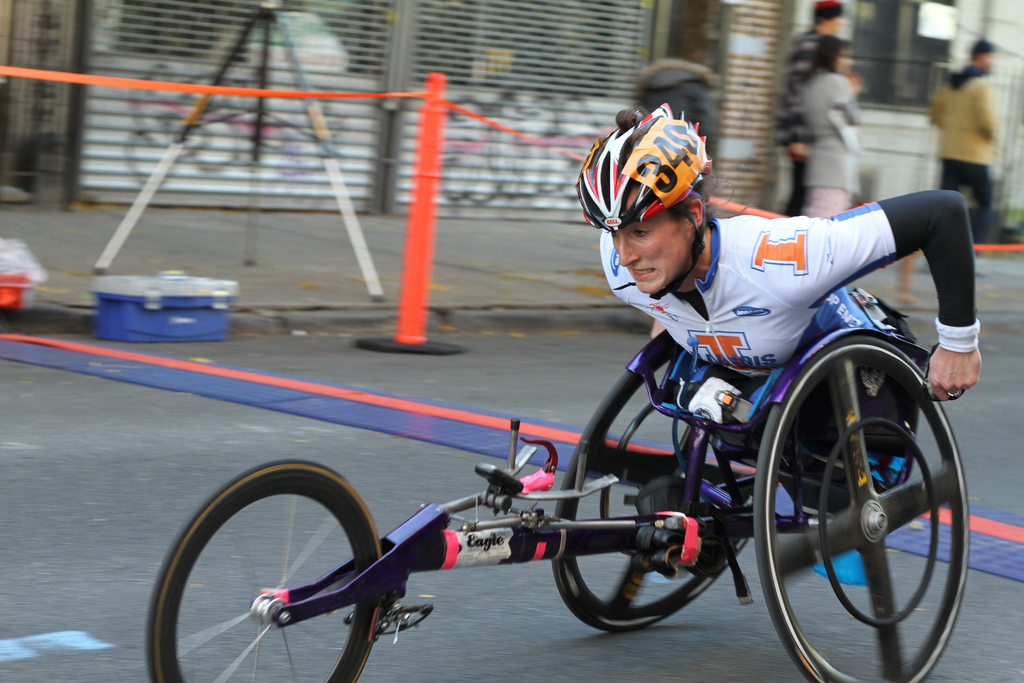
New York City Marathon 2011

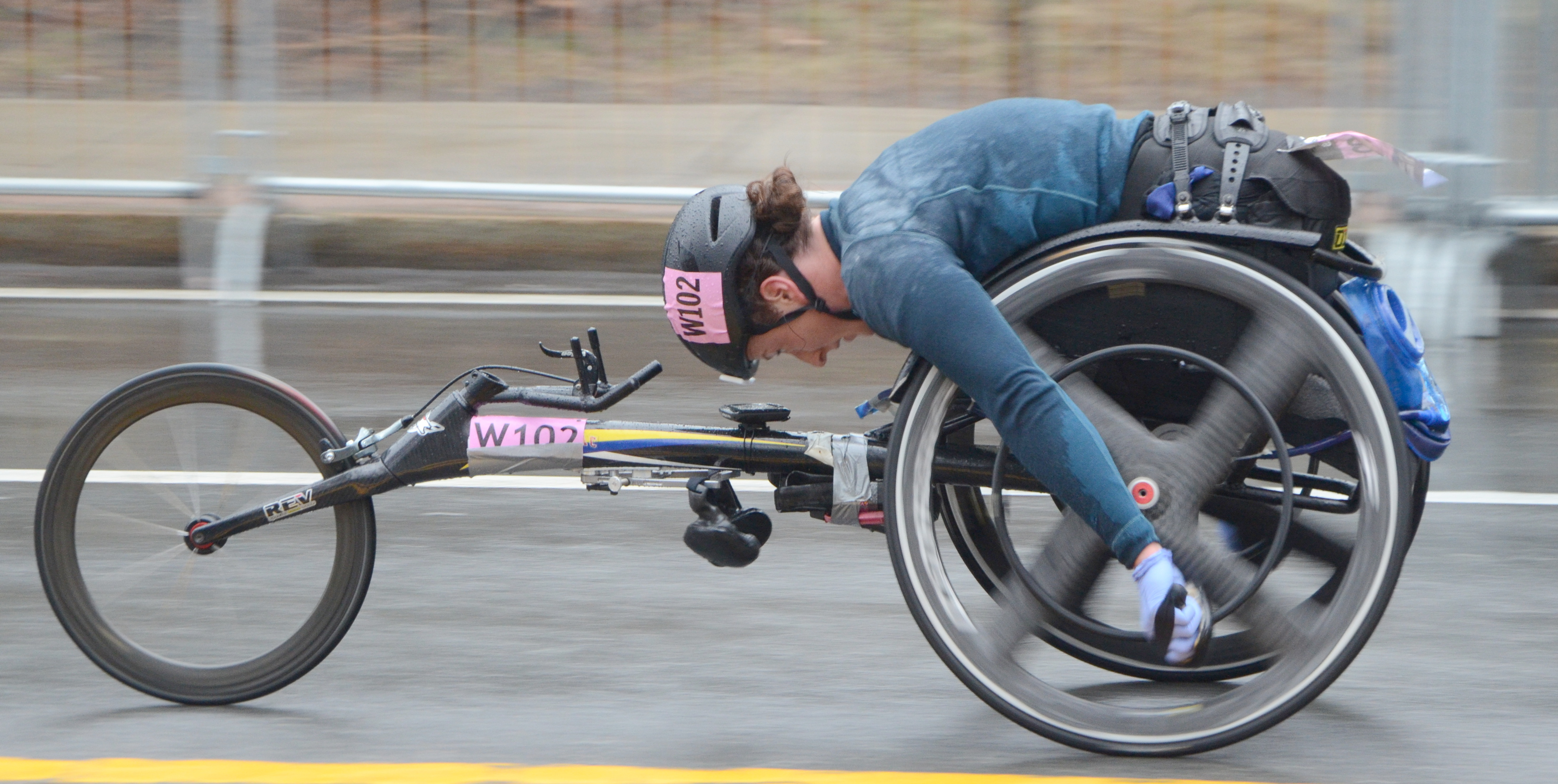
Tatyana McFadden near halfway point of Boston Marathon 2018 in which she got first place.

- 2003: Member of U.S. Paralympics Track & Field National Team
- 2004: Silver medal, 100m; Bronze medal, 200m – 2004 Summer Paralympics
- 2005: Gold medal, 100m; Two silver medals, 400m, 800m; Bronze medal, 200m – IPC Open European National Championships, Espoo, Finland
- 2006: Gold medal, 100m (WR); Two silver medals, 200m, 400m,) – IPC World Championships, Assen, The Netherlands
- 2007: Three second-place finishes, 200m, 400m, 800m – Meet in the Heat, Atlanta, Ga.
- 2007: Two first-place finishes, 200m, 800m – U.S. Paralympics Track & Field National Championships, Atlanta, Ga.
- 2007: First place, 200m (WR) – Boiling Point Wheelchair Track Classic, Windsor, Ontario, Canada
- 2007: Two gold medals, 400m, 800m – Paralympic World Cup, Manchester, United Kingdom
- 2008: Silver medal, 200m T54; silver medal, 400m T54; silver medal, 800m T54; bronze medal, Women's 4 × 100 m relay T53/T54 – 2008 Summer Paralympics.
- 2010: Won the Open Women's Division of the Shepherd Center Wheelchair Division of the AJC Peachtree Road Race in Atlanta with the time of 23:47:66.
- 2011: Won the 2011 Open Women's Division of the Shepherd Center Wheelchair Division of the AJC Peachtree Road Race in Atlanta with the time of 23:39:26.
- 2012: Won the 2012 Open Women's Division of the Shepherd Center Wheelchair Division of the AJC Peachtree Road Race in Atlanta with the time of 23:53:08.
- 2012: 100m T54; 400m T54; gold medal, 800m T54; 1500m T54; marathon –2012 Summer Paralympics.
- 2013: Won the women's wheelchair divisions of the Boston, Chicago, London, and New York City marathons in 2013. This makes her the first person – non-disabled or otherwise – to win four major marathons in the same year. She also set a new course record for the Chicago Marathon (1 hour, 42 minutes, 35 seconds).
- 2013: Became the first athlete to win six gold medals at a championships during the 2013 IPC Athletics World Championships in Lyon. She claimed gold in every event from the 100 meters through to the 5,000 meters.
- 2014: Won the 2014 Boston Marathon wheelchair division.
- 2014: Won gold at the London Marathon, in a new course record.
- 2014: Won the 2014 Open Women's Division of the Shepherd Center Wheelchair Division of the AJC Peachtree Road Race in Atlanta with the time of 23:17:42.
- 2014: Won the women's wheelchair division of the 2014 New York City Marathon with a time of 1:42:16.
- 2015: Won gold at the London Marathon, in a new course record.
- 2015: Won the 2015 Open Women's Division of the Shepherd Center Wheelchair Division of the AJC Peachtree Road Race in Atlanta with the time of 23:57:23
- 2015: Won the women's wheelchair division of the 2015 New York City Marathon.
- 2016: Won the 2016 Boston Marathon wheelchair division.
- 2016: Won the 2016 Open Women's Division of the Shepherd Center Wheelchair Division of the AJC Peachtree Road Race in Atlanta with the time of 23:14.56
- 2016: Won gold at the 2016 London Marathon wheelchair division.
- 2016: Won silver in the 100 meters at the 2016 Summer Paralympics.
- 2017: Won the Bank of America Chicago Marathon wheelchair division.
- 2018: Won the 2018 Boston Marathon wheelchair division.
- 2021: Won the 2021 Open Women's Division of the Shepherd Center Wheelchair Division of the AJC Peachtree Road Race in Atlanta with the time of 24:07.52
- 2021: Won the 2021 Chicago Marathon wheelchair division, earning her 9th Chicago Marathon title.

Awards
Preceded by (France) Marie Bochet	Laureus World Sportsperson with a Disability of the Year; 2015	Succeeded by (Brazil) Daniel Dias
