= Peachtree Road Race =

Annual 10-kilometer run in Atlanta, Georgia, US

Northside Hospital Peachtree Road Race Northside Hospital Polar Opposite Peachtree Road Race
- Date: January (north); July 4th (south)
- Location: Atlanta, Georgia, United States
- Event type: Road
- Distance: 10 kilometers (6.2 mi)
- Primary sponsor: Northside Hospital System
- Established: July 4, 1970; 56 years ago
- Course records: South: Men: 27:04 (1996); Joseph Kimani; Women: 30:21 (2019); Brigid Kosgei; North: Men: 32:26; Nathan Solomon (2026); Women: 35:10 (2026); Grace Clements Bremen, GA (2026)
- Website: Official website
- Participants: 60,000

The Peachtree Road Race (branded Northside Hospital Peachtree Road Race for sponsorship reasons) is a series of two 10-kilometer runs held annually in Atlanta, once during the first weekend of January and the other on Independence Day. They are held on the same course in opposite directions, similar to the Comrades Marathon in South Africa, although unlike the Comrades, the "north" (up) and "south" (down) versions are run in the same year.

The "South" (running down) Peachtree was founded in 1970 and has been the world's largest 10k race since the late 1970s. The race has become a citywide tradition in which over 70,000 amateur and professional runners try to register for one of the limited 60,000 spots. The event also includes a wheelchair race (known as the Shepherd Center wheelchair division), which precedes the footrace. In recent years, the race also has a special division for soldiers stationed in the Middle East. The race attracts some of the world's elite 10K runners and has served as both the United States' men's and women's 10K championship.

Children can participate in the Peachtree Junior 1 mile run or 50m Dash, held on July 3 in Piedmont Park.

The "North" (running up) Peachtree, officially the Northside Hospital Polar Opposite Peachtree Road Race was announced by the Atlanta Track Club on October 10, 2024. The inaugural was held on January 4, 2025 and will be scheduled for the first Saturday of the new year. As the name implies, the course is run in the opposite direction of the more familiar southern race, from 10th Street at Piedmont Park to Lenox Square.

== History ==
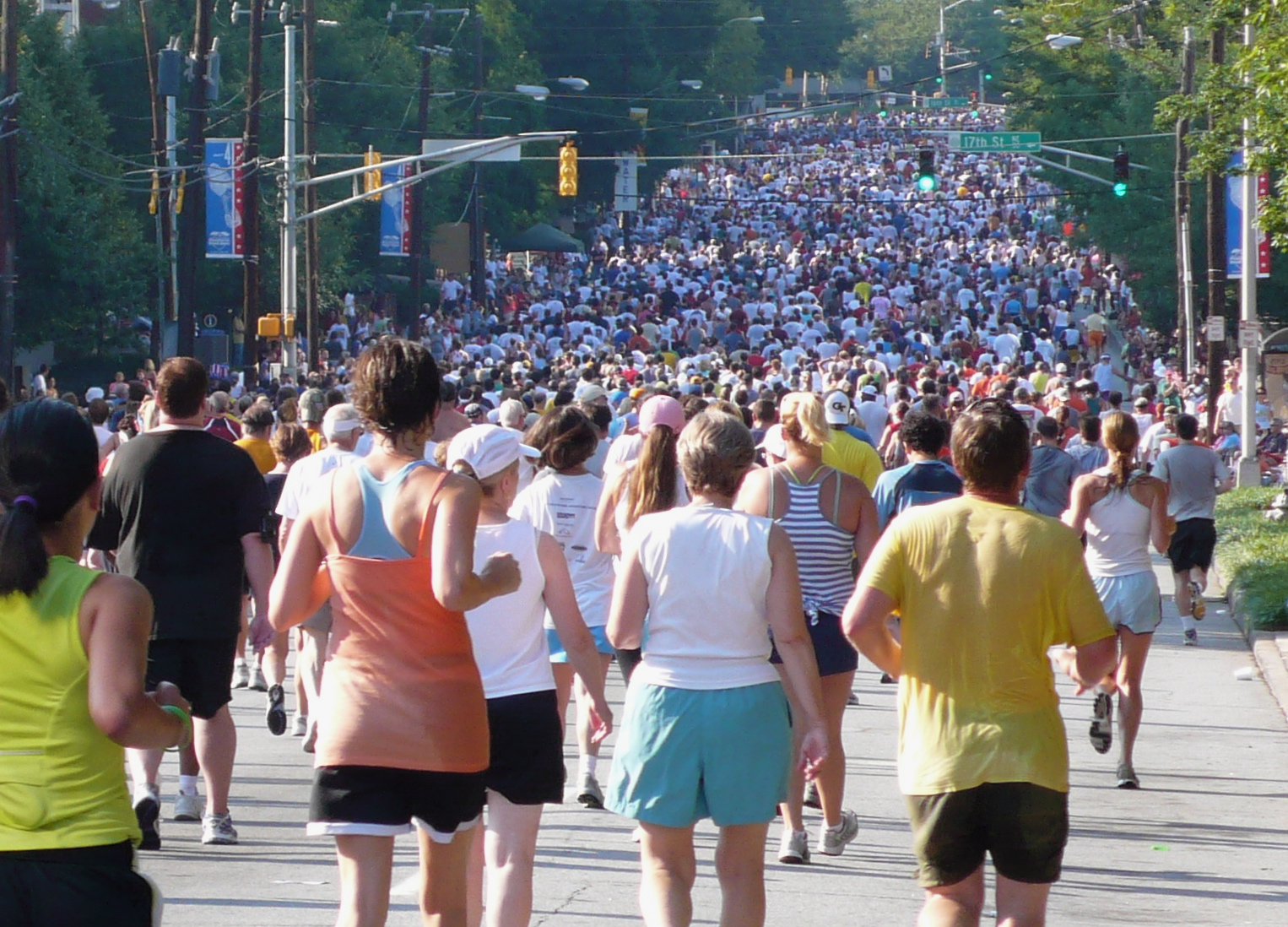
2007 Peachtree Road Race

The AJC Peachtree Road Race was started in 1970 by the Atlanta Track Club. The first year, 110 runners ran from the old Sears building at the corner of Peachtree Street and Roswell Road to Central City Park (now Woodruff Park). The race was sponsored by Carling Brewery. The next year, the race increased to 198 runners. Organizers used the sponsorship money to purchase T-shirts but underestimated the number of participants. T-shirts were given out to the first finishers, until they ran out. In 1972, the organizers ordered only 250 T-shirts but 330 runners ran the race. In 1974, the event grew to 765 runners; in 1975 there were over 1,000 runners.

In 1976, Carling Brewery dropped its sponsorship of the race and The Atlanta Journal-Constitution began sponsoring the race, bringing it added coverage and popularity, a sponsorship that ran 50 years and 51 races (49 south and two north races). That year over 2,300 runners competed. In 1977 over 6,500 runners competed, overwhelming the capacity of Central City Park. As a result, in 1978 the course was moved to starting at Lenox Square and finishing at Piedmont Park. In 1979 the race attracted over 20,000 runners. In 1980, the number of participants was limited to 25,000 runners, which continued until 1990. In 1982, the Shepherd Center wheelchair division was formed for the race.

The race became so popular that by 1989, the race reached capacity in only nine days and Atlanta Track Club increased the limit to 40,000 in 1990. In 1992, it expanded to 45,000 runners; in 1995, it expanded to 50,000 runners, followed by a 10% expansion in 1998 to 55,000 runners; it would not be until 2011 that the capacity was expanded to 60,000.

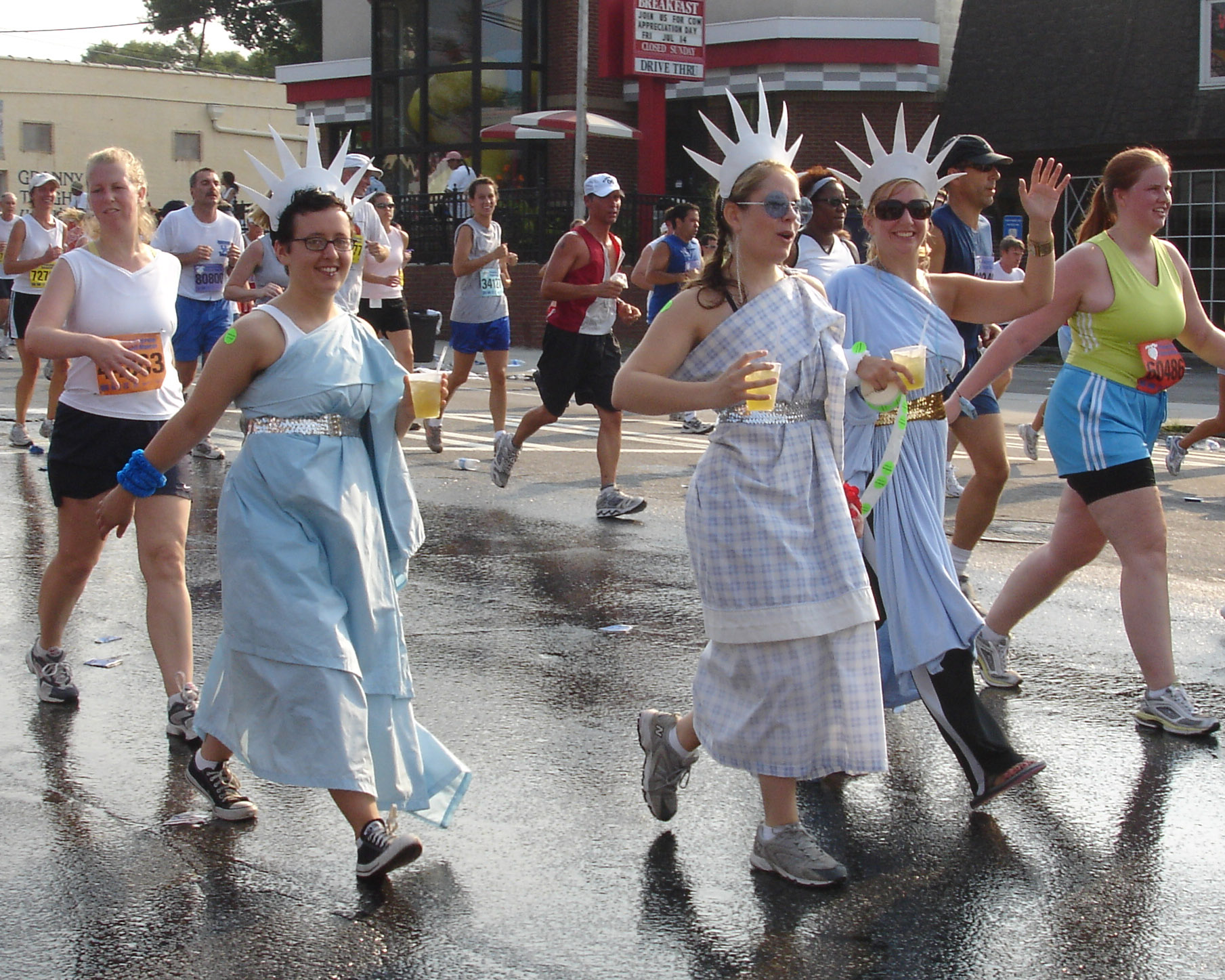
2006 Peachtree Road Race participants wearing US-patriotic costumes

The AJC Peachtree Road Race has become an event important in Atlanta culture. In addition to the 60,000 participants, there are approximately 150,000 observers who line both sides of the entire course to cheer and support the runners. Some runners deliberately wear costumes, many of which are patriotic (due to the event's occurring on Independence Day). The entire race is also televised on WXIA-TV.

The race hosted the USA Men's 10 km Championship in 2007.

=== 2008 changes ===
With the entire north Georgia region facing historic drought conditions in 2008, water conservation measures were enacted prohibiting outdoor watering of plants and lawns. As a result of the watering ban, the City of Atlanta decided to prohibit large festivals (over 50,000 people) from using Piedmont Park in 2008 in order to protect the grass lawns which could not be watered. Displaced events included the Atlanta Pride, Jazz, and Dogwood Festivals as well as the Peachtree Road Race which traditionally used Piedmont Park for the finish line of the race and distribution of T-shirts. The AJC Peachtree Road Race considered moving the finish area to Georgia Tech, but Georgia Tech refused, citing safety concerns. On February 19, it was announced that the race finish line would be at the intersection of Juniper Street and Ponce de Leon Avenue in Midtown. Runners then walked three more blocks to the Atlanta Civic Center parking area where the awards stage, family meeting area and sponsor village were located. The race returned to its previous course in 2009.

=== 2009 changes ===
Starting in 2009, and in association with Atlanta Track Club, registration applications began to be accepted online on the Active.com site starting on the third Sunday in March. Controversy ruled over the 2009 registration, as over 800 complaints were filed because of server failures by the outsourced registration. The 45,000 applications sold out within hours.

The following Sunday, applications for the 10,000 slot lottery are published in The Atlanta Journal-Constitution. These slots are randomly selected from remaining applications post-marked by March 31.

Atlanta Track Club experimented in November 2008 at The Weather Channel Atlanta Marathon and Half Marathon with implementation of the ChronoTrack D-Tag transponder system, a disposable tag system. Following its success, the organization announced that starting with the 2009 Peachtree, all runners—not just the elite and timegroup 1 runners—will be timed. Doing this will help with positioning runners for future Peachtree events.

=== 2010 changes ===
Online registration for the 2010 PRR opened on Sunday, March 21, at 1:00 pm. The first 45,000 online applicants receive race entry. Additionally, a paper application appeared in the March 28 AJC. 10,000 entries were to be randomly selected from all paper applications received. The online spots were filled in less than five hours.

In one of the biggest changes seen in race history, starting assignments for all participants will be performance-based. Once the top-seeded and sub-seeded runners start, timegroups 1A, 1B, and 2-9 have been replaced with start waves A-W (19 in total, with letters I, O, Q and V omitted). Applicants are able to submit results from an official race (run on a USATF-certified course), run on or after March 1, 2008, of distances of 5 miles, 10K, 10 miles, the 1/2 marathon, and for the first time, the shorter 5K distance.

=== 2011 changes ===
Atlanta Track Club switched to an exclusive lottery format online for the 2011 Peachtree. Most of the 60,000 positions were determined by a lottery draw, with selected exceptions for elite invited athletes, the members of the organizing club, and those who have run ten or more consecutive Peachtree Road Races, all of which were allowed automatic entry. Also, those who pay $150 for the organizers' charity would be automatically entered.

=== 2020 cancellation ===
The March 15 opening of lottery and Atlanta Track Club member registration occurred just four days after the Rudy Gobert COVID-19 positive test at an NBA game that caused a shutdown of sport in the United States. The resulting lottery and club member registration only drew 45,000 entries, with the race only was three-fourths full by the traditional lottery deadline of March 31. Atlanta Track Club cancelled the drawing, awarding all 45,000 entries an automatic entry into the Peachtree.

On May 1, 2020, the Atlanta Track Club announced the cancellation of the Invesco QQQ Half Marathon usually held on Thanksgiving Day and will instead hold the Peachtree on November 26, 2020, a byproduct of the coronavirus pandemic. A second round of member registration will be held in September, followed by registration to fill out the field later in the month, for the November date.

The race was officially cancelled in August 2020, which the Atlanta Track Club used to move two other races that were to be part of the Triple Peach outside Fulton County, which was under restrictions imposed by the county, and into closed-course motor racing circuits (which are private property) outside the county. The PNC 10 Miler in October moved to Michelin Raceway in Hall County and the 2021 Atlanta Marathon was relocated to the perimeter roads and parking lots surrounding, and finishing with laps inside, Atlanta Motor Speedway in Henry County.

=== 51st Peachtree: July 3–4, 2021 ===
The Atlanta Track Club announced in January 2021 that the 51st Peachtree Road Race would be held July 3–4, 2021, with runners being assigned to either the July 3 or July 4 wave. The two-day event was held on its traditional course.

=== 55th Peachtree: North and South Peachtrees and Lottery Returns ===
Changes were made to the Peachtree Road Race for 2025. During the 2024 AJC Peachtree Road Race, it was announced after four years without a lottery, demand returned to pre-pandemic levels and the Peachtree lottery draw returned. A one-week span from July 4–11 allowed participants to enter the race without being put in the lottery.

On October 10, 2024, the Atlanta Track Club meeting where the 2025 schedule for the organisation was announced, the new "north" version of the Peachtree, the AJC Polar Opposite Peachtree, was announced. It is scheduled for the first weekend of January, with the course going in the opposite direction, similar to the Comrades Marathon in South Africa. Registration for that race was started November 1, 2024, and sold out in less than six hours. In keeping with the Peachtree Road Race tradition, finishers receive a hooded sweatshirt. It was announced on January 16, 2025 that registration for the 2026 "north" Peachtree will be open to Atlanta Track Club members for one day only in February and registration for the general public will begin on July 4, 2025, after the end of the "south" Peachtree. Both the north and south races will have registration open on July 4 for the next year's race.

=== 56th South Peachtree (2026): A New Beginning ===
The second North Peachtree drew 7,214 runners on January 3, 2026.

With the ceasing of publication of The Atlanta Journal-Constitution by owners Cox Media, the Atlanta Track Club announced on February 10, 2026, effective immediately for the 56th south Peachtree, the Northside Hospital System will be named title sponsor of both Peachtree events.

== Qualification ==
=== Qualifying events ===
The Peachtree Road Race has a list of regional races that serve as qualifiers for the race.

January

- Braselton Lifeway 8K/5K
- MLK Day 5k Drum Run
- Peachtree City 8K/15K
- Norcross High School Blue Devils Run
- Dr. James H. Crowdis Run 5K/10K
- Milton Boys Lacrosse 5K
- Cool Shark 5K
- The Frozen 5K
- First Watch Locomotive Half Marathon/5K
- East Metro Atlanta 5K

February

- Atlanta Hawks Fast Break 5K
- PT Solutions Cupid Chase 5K
- Run For Angels 5K/10K
- Suwanee Half Marathon
- Tartan Trot 5K/10K
- Hearts & Soles 5K
- Southsides Fastest 5k
- The With or Without You 5K
- Atlanta Mission 5k Race to End Homelessness
- Wiphan Warthog Waddle
- Love Run 5K sponsored by DeKalb DA Sherry Boston
- Augusta University Half Marathon, 10K, & 5K
- Run for the Son
- Love in Action 5K

March

- Awesomesauce 5K and 1 Mile Fun Run
- Chattahoochee Road Race 10K & 5K
- Dental Dash at Dawn 5k
- Finish Lion 5K
- Run Dahlonega 5K
- Berry Half Marathon/10k/5k
- Shamrock 'N Roll Road Race
- Marietta Shamrock Shuffle 5k
- Gwinnett Life Run 5K
- Water Drop Dash 5k
- Publix Georgia Marathon & Half Marathon
- Atlanta Women's 5K
- Cass Cannonball 5K/10K
- Refuge Run 5K/10K
- Brookhaven Cherry Blossom Festival 5K
- Run For Ronald 5K
- Chasing Moonlight/Racing Sunlight, the Tropical Smoothie Cafe 5K in Paradise
- The Lucky Leprechaun 5K
- Junior League of Macon Road Race

April

- The Daffodil Dash
- Singleton 5K/10K
- Pace Race 5K
- Dallas Race for a Cure
- Annual Sickle Cell Road Race
- The Fantastic Movie Run 10K
- Tropical Smoothie Cafe 5K

May

- Hustle for Hope 5K Run
- Swift Cantrell Classic 5k
- Brookhaven Bolt
- Fast Track 5k
- Project 82 Kenya 5K

June

- Turbo Dash 10K
- Braves Country 5K/10K
- Odyssey 5K Run
- Dream Dash 5K
- Healthy Heart 5K
- Run with the Badges 5K Glow Run

July

- AJC Peachtree Road Race
- The Sports Fanatic 5k
- Decatur Dekalb 4 Miler
- Leadership Butts Glow Run
- Hi-Tech Race Series 5K

August

- Hero Run 5k
- Tailgate 5K Presented by Georgia's Own Credit
- Atlanta's Finest 5K
- The ATL 10K
- Walk, Wag, N' Run 5K

September

- Big Peach Sizzler 10K
- The Birchmore Memorial Run for Fun 5K
- Team Maggie 5K/10K
- ADMH Run for Health
- Wingfoot XC Classic
- Great Locomotive Chase 5k
- Mercedes-Benz Stadium 5K/Walk Like MADD
- Superhero 5K Run Walk
- Race to End Violence

October

- ADVF Walk a Mile in Their Shoes 5k
- Duluth Donut Dash 5K
- Lily's Run and Family Festival 5K
- Cobb County 5K to benefit Make-A-Wish Georgia
- JE Dunn Hammer Down 5k
- Annual Run Your Tail Off 5K
- PNC Atlanta 10 Miler & 5K
- 2017 Gin Run 5K
- Racin' in the 'Burg 5K
- 17th Annual Jack O'Lantern Jog 5K
- Officer's Down 5K - DeKalb County Police Department
- Big Pumpkin Run 5K
- Garden Gallop 5K
- Angel Dash 5K
- Cupcake RUN! ATL 5K
- Spooktacular Chase 10K & 5K
- CLIF Craft Coffee Fest 5K
- Winship Win the Fight 5K

November

- Starry Night 5K
- Holiday Haulin' 5K and Fun Run
- Stuff the Bus 5K Run/Walk
- Race for Grace Half Marathon
- Smyrna Village 5K & 10K
- Thanksgiving Day Half Marathon & 5K
- Jefferson First Baptist Church 9th Annual 5K Turkey Can Run/Walk
- St. Peter Chanel 5K
- 30A 10K

=== Race registration and starting group placement ===
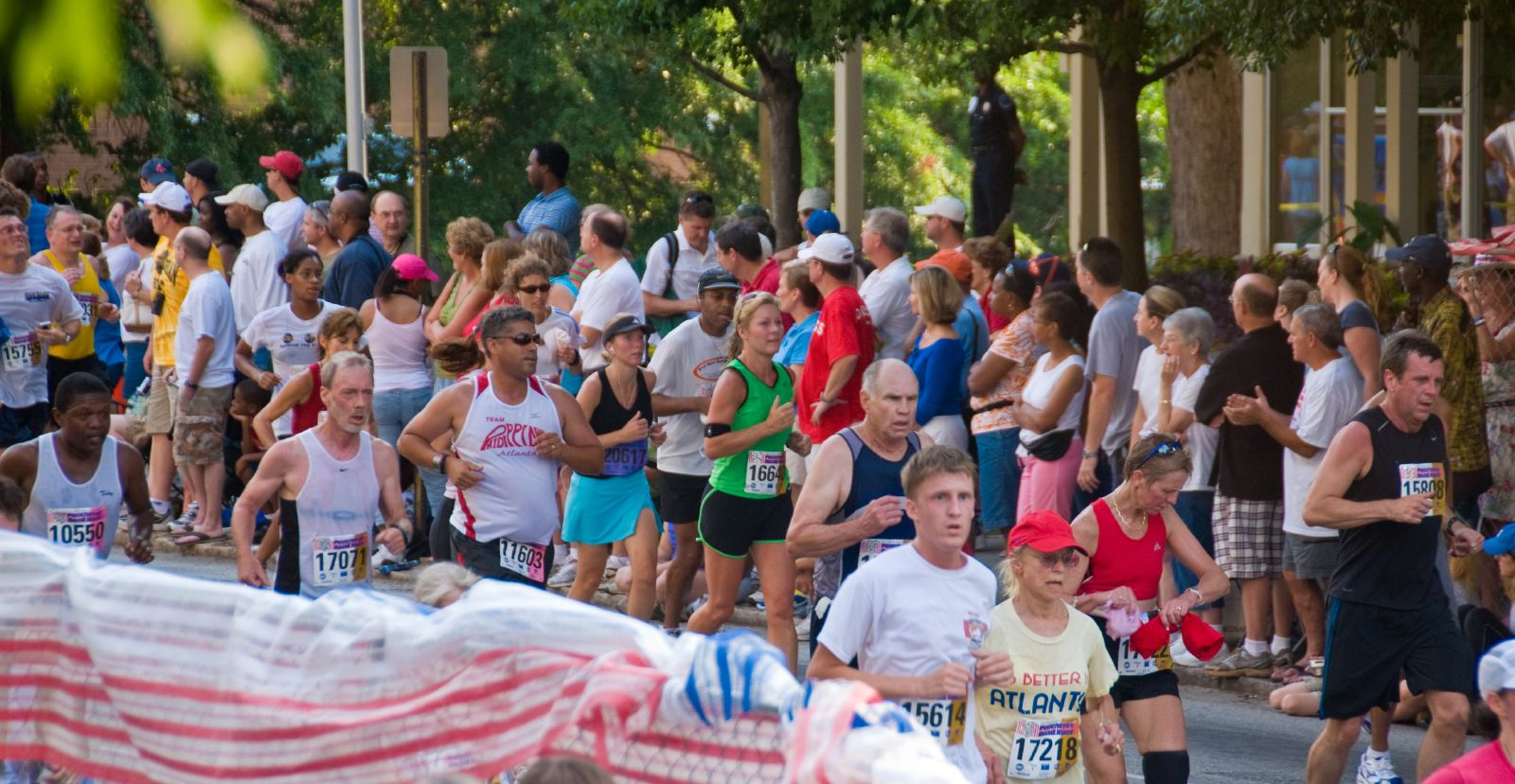
Runners on procession

Until 2008, applications for registration in the AJC Peachtree Road Race were published in The Atlanta Journal-Constitution on the third Sunday in March. The first 45,000 applications received were automatically entered into the race; an additional 10,000 applications are randomly selected from remaining applications post-marked by March 31. The race is currently limited to 60,000 entries. The 2009 registration fee was $33. Atlanta Track Club requires runners to be at least 10 years of age by the day of the race.

The race is divided into 21 starting groups, all based on times verified at USA Track and Field certified courses with the past two years at distances between 5 km and 21.1 km (half marathon) races that the runner must submit to the Atlanta Track Club at time of registration in March. The last groups (W, X, and Y) will be assigned to runners who did not send a verified time from a USATF-certified course. Seeded runners, invited athletes, and the first group (Group A) start at 7:30 AM, while groups are launched at intervals of between four and six minutes each, with the last group (Group Y) starting at 9:05 AM.

Due to the limited number of spaces available in the race, as well as the three and a half month advance registration requirement, some people have attempted to sell their number on eBay and craigslist, although this practice is prohibited by Atlanta Track Club. Runners who are assigned a number for the race, and subsequently cannot run, are able to return their number to Atlanta Track Club in exchange for a card guaranteeing placement in next year's race. (Registration fees, however, are not refunded.)

On July 4, 2007, three men were caught sneaking in to the AJC Peachtree Road Race. In addition to a $1,000 fine, each was banned from the AJC Peachtree Road Race for life.

For the return of the lottery in the "south" Peachtree in July 2025, the lottery will be conducted in April. All entries for the lottery are done in April, and will be added to Atlanta Track Club members, those who registered in the first week after the 2024 Peachtree, and those who participated in the "north" Peachtree in January 2025.

== Course description ==
The AJC Peachtree Road Race is a 10,000-meter road race. The "south" Peachtree race starts on Peachtree Road at Lenox Square Mall (just south of Lenox Road). The race continues down Peachtree into midtown Atlanta, turning left onto 10th Street for the final kilometer before ending at 10th St. and Charles Allen Drive. Piedmont Park provides the setting for post-race festivities that include a stage for live performances and an awards ceremony. After a largely downhill first half, runners cross Peachtree Creek and tackle the grueling 3/4 mile-long "Hope Hill," formerly known as "Cardiac Hill," which culminates at Peachtree and Collier Rd. in front of Piedmont Hospital. Mile 5 has been known as the Olympic Mile, where banners and theme music entertained IOC members in 1990 during Atlanta's bid for the 1996 Summer Olympics.

In 2008, because of severe drought conditions, the race was unable to end in Piedmont Park, and runners turned east onto 10th Street before heading to Juniper Street, ending at the intersection of Ponce de Leon and Juniper St, where racers finished by going uphill instead of the older downhill stretch of 10th St. Runners then walked a short distance to the Atlanta Civic Center for finish-line festivities. This unpopular course lasted one year, after which the course returned to the traditional pattern.

As typical of other road races, the roads used are completely closed to vehicular traffic and observers watch from the sidewalks. Water is provided at each mile; approximately 500,000 cups and 120,000 gallons of water are used. Approximately 3,000 volunteers are needed to work the race.

Due to the large crowds, limited parking and road closures, many runners utilize MARTA to travel to the start site and back from the finish line.

The "north" Peachtree, known as the Polar Opposite, is exactly the reverse, starting at 10th Street and Piedmont Park, turning right to Peachtree Street and taking Cardiac Hill down, then Peachtree Creek, and an uphill second half, ending at Lenox Square Mall.

== Official starters ==
University of Georgia track and field coach Spec Towns shot the starter pistol to start the first Peachtree Road Race in 1970. Georgia Governor Jimmy Carter started the second race and Georgia Lt. Governor Lester Maddox the third. Since then, many notable people have started the race. Georgia Tech coach and politician Buddy Fowlkes was another official starter.

== Original 110 ==
The 110 runners who finished the first Peachtree Road Race are known as the "Original 110". Bill Thorn, Sr. completed the first 52 Peachtree Road Races from 1970 to 2022. The 92-year old ended his streak after the 2022 race. In honor of the streak, Thorn was granted a ceremonial crossing of the finish line and his name engraved on the Peachtree cup, which is normally reserved for race champions, and named the grand marshal for the 2023 race, the first year of the honor.

=== Results of 1970 race ===
- 1. Jeff Galloway 32:31.6
- 2. Joel Majors 33:12
- 3. Michael Caldwell 35:52
- 4. Charles Patterson 36:21
- 5. David Senechalle 36:39
- 6. Julian Dooley 36:42
- 7. Jimmy Knight 36:46
- 8. Jim Schaper 36:58
- 9. Alan Johnson 37:27
- 10. David Storey 37:51
- 11. Alan Taylor 37:54
- 12.Chris Mullis 38:07
- 13. Kim Dammers 38:16
- 14. Gary Wilson 38:25
- 15. Dennis Fifield 38:39
- 16. Jack Moore 38:55
- 17. Alan Armstrong 39:38
- 18. Ken Winn 40:00
- 19. Billy Collins 40:07
- 20. Mark Bolt 40:16
- 21. Phil Gardner 40:19
- 22. Stan Hess 40:23
- 23. Talley Kirkland 40:34
- 24. Don Capron 40:39
- 25. Jimmy Thyne 40:44
- 26. Mike Shelton 40:52
- 27. Virgil Smith 41:16
- 28. Bob Bennett 41:44
- 29. Charlie Harris 41:48
- 30. Jim Beach 42:37
- 31. Denny Hieber 42:48
- 32. David Majors 43:07
- 33. Charles Gilbert 43:07
- 34. Jon Ward 43:12
- 35. Ralph Ford 43:16
- 36. Max Clayton 43:23
- 37. Ken King 43:30
- 38. Matt Morrow 43:54
- 39. Charlie Gibson 44:23
- 40. John Oeltman 44:27
- 41. Dave Gamel 44:29
- 42. Mark Snipes 45:10
- 43. Don Ray 45:29
- 44. John Bacheller 45:43
- 45. Ralph Smith 45:43
- 46. Jim Wagner 45:55
- 47. Jim Turner 46:32
- 48. Wayne Eleton 46:50
- 49. Weyman Dunahoo 46:57
- 50. Claude Crider 46:57
- 51. Tommy Durham 47:02
- 52. Jim Goldsack 47:31
- 53. John Head 47:44
- 54. Michael Halpen 47:57
- 55. Jim Gaines 48:15
- 56. John Cantwell 48:30
- 57. Thomas Butts 48:31
- 58. Frank Clegg 48:43
- 59. Robert Barnett 48:51
- 60. L.A. Larrco 48:55
- 61. Oliver Porter 48:56
- 62. Gayle Barron 49:13
- 63. Ben Barron 49:13
- 64. Jack McFarland 49:21
- 65. Richard Smith 49:33
- 66. Joe Shepherd 49:53
- 67. Mike Boack 50:12
- 68. Jon Robere 50:14
- 69. Ted Sammons 50:30
- 70. Herbert Zwerner 50:45
- 71. Duncan MacGregor 50:51
- 72. W.F. Lawrence 50:53
- 73. Tom Adderholt 50:56
- 74. Bob Jones 51:10
- 75. Charles Rappold 51:12
- 76. Bill Thorn Jr. 51:20
- 77. Bill Thorn Sr. 51:20
- 78. Chuck Gamel 51:25
- 79. Victor Krampl 52:45
- 80. William F. Echbert Jr. 52:50
- 81. Joan Rogers 53:29
- 82. Harold Canfield 53:30
- 83. Robert Fink 53:31
- 84. Sam Clement 53:37
- 85. Irving Singer 53:43
- 86. Frank Neil 53:47
- 87. Lewis Birdseye 55:53
- 88. Maria Birdseye 56:07
- 89. Larry Taffel 56:08
- 90. Harry Woods 56:11
- 91. Edwin Elrod 56:16
- 92. Clyde Partin Jr. 56:21
- 93. Thomas Bolt 56:36
- 94. Johnny Turrentine 56:41
- 95. Earl Jones 56:42
- 96. Donald Vinnick 56:57
- 97. Alan Salzman 57:06
- 98. J.D. Collier 57:10
- 99. Jim Lyon 57:34
- 100. Bill Maness 57:54
- 101. Clyde Partin Sr. 58:06
- 102. Dennis Holloway 59:15
- 103. Marvin Mitchell 59:30
- 104. Brian Gamel 61:12
- 105. Terry Thorn 61:12
- 106. Leonard Loudermilk 63:11
- 107. Robert Manning 66:37
- 108. Brad Rosselle 67:12
- 109. John Wagner 67:13
- 110. Dan Ashby 67:15

== T-shirts ==
The official race T-shirt is perhaps the most popular aspect of the AJC Peachtree Road Race, perhaps due to the limited numbers of T-shirts available in the early race years. Each year a different design is chosen through a contest sponsored by The Atlanta Journal-Constitution newspaper and a limited number of shirts are made. T-shirts are available to only those runners who finish the race, and thus have become a status-symbol among Atlanta culture.

== Race financials ==
It is estimated that the AJC Peachtree Road Race costs over $1,000,000, if in-kind contributions are included. The race must pay between $25,000 and $30,000 to government agencies for their costs of supporting the race. T-shirts for runners and volunteers are estimated to cost over $200,000. The race also pays $25,000 for its timing system and $100,000 for contract labor. The AJC Peachtree Road Race was estimated in 2003 to have an economic impact over $10,000,000. Profits from the race entry fees and sponsorships are used to fund the Atlanta Track Club.

== Events ==
=== Race competitions ===
==== Kilometer Kids Charity Chase ====
First held during the 2014 race, the annual Kilometer Kids Charity Chase features six teams representing each branch of the military: Air Force, Army, Coast Guard, Marine Corps, National Guard and the Navy. Each team will have six runners each, all competing for bragging rights in two areas: the fastest military branch, and the team that receives the most donations for Atlanta Track Club's Kilometer Kids youth running program.

The military competition takes place after the Shepherd Center Wheelchair Division of the AJC Peachtree Road Race, and before the Peachtree Cup elite competition and general race waves begin.

The online portion of the fundraiser allows supporters to select a military team at the time of donation. All proceeds go towards the Atlanta Track Club's Kilometer Kids youth program. Starting in 2015, a portion of the donations are to go towards starting a Kilometer Kids program at Fort Benning, the first one to be established on a military base.

==== Peachtree Cup ====
The Peachtree Cup is an elite team competition that had its inaugural at the 2015 Peachtree Road Race. The competition takes place after the Kilometer Kids Charity Chase and before the general race waves began their run. The Peachtree Cup features four entries: Team USA, Team Africa, Team Asia, and Team Europe. The roster of each team consist of six athletes, three men and three women vying for international bragging rights. One member of each team is selected as the team captain. The determining of the winning team consists of combining each of the team members’ individual finish times together and the team with the fastest cumulative time is the winner. The team that comes in first place will receive the first-place prize of $42,000 US.

=== Race series ===
==== Ultimate Peach Race Series ====
Current logo of the Atlanta Track Club Triple Peach Race Series

The Atlanta Track Club Triple Peach Race Series presented by Mizuno, a program designed to improve the Atlanta running experience, features three of Atlanta's top running events: AJC Peachtree Road Race, Atlanta 10-Miler (in October) and the Thanksgiving Day Half Marathon (Thanksgiving Day) (all races that were part of the original Atlanta Marathon). The annual race series was started in 2013 by the Atlanta Track Club and partner sponsor Volkswagen Group of America. It was originally called the VW Triple Peach, but Volkswagen of America dropped its sponsorship of the race after only the first year, resulting in the race series' being renamed the Atlanta Track Club Triple Peach Race Series the following year, 2014. In 2015, Mizuno Corporation became the new program sponsor.

The Triple Peach is limited to 4,000 participants. Registration includes one low price for the Atlanta 10-Miler and the Thanksgiving Day Half Marathon. All participants receive a Triple Peach finisher's medal and a Triple Peach finisher's T-shirt. The program also uses unique bibs that allow participants the opportunity to self-seed in the start corrals at both the Atlanta 10-Miler and the Thanksgiving Day Half Marathon. Upon finishing the Thanksgiving Day Half Marathon, Triple Peach participants meet at a special celebration area to be officially recognized and to fine-tune the program for the coming year.

In 2020, the Triple Peach was replaced by an unofficial Double Peach with the cancellation of the Peachtree. The Atlanta 10-Miler was held in Braselton at Michelin Raceway (three lap race, first two laps integrated an infield section) and the Thanksgiving Day Half Marathon was replaced by the Publix Half Marathon in Hampton with perimeter roads of the Atlanta Motor Speedway.

In the 2025-26 season, the Ultimate Peach replaced the Triple Peach. The Ultimate Peach adds the Atlanta Marathon to the races.

===== Triple Peach Junior Race Series =====
In 2023 the Atlanta Track Club announced the inception of the Triple Peach Junior, the youth version of the Triple Peach Race Series for kids 14 years and under. To qualify for Triple Peach Junior, youth runners, and walkers must register for and complete the following in-person events:

- Microsoft Peachtree Junior
- PNC Atlanta Mile & Dash
- Invesco QQQ Thanksgiving Day Mile & Dash

There is not a separate registration for Triple Peach Junior. Participants are automatically entered into the series once they have signed up for all three in-person events (either mile or dash). At the Invesco QQQ Thanksgiving Day Mile & Dash, eligible runners/walkers for the Triple Peach Junior Series are recognized with unique stickers on their race bib on Thanksgiving Day. Upon race completion, participants are awarded the Triple Peach Junior Finisher's medal.

=== Wheelchair division ===
Founded in 1982 by the Shepherd Center, the Shepherd Center Wheelchair Division of AJC Peachtree Road Race precedes the foot race, starting at 6:45 am. The wheelchair division follows the same 10-kilometer course run by the foot runners down Peachtree Road, starting at Lenox Road and ending on 10th Street at Piedmont Park in Midtown. Since its 1981 founding, the wheelchair division has grown in popularity so that the race now attracts more than 78 wheelchair racers ranging in age from 16 to 69 and representing more than nine countries. Today, the Shepherd Center Wheelchair Division of AJC Peachtree Road Race is considered one of the largest and fastest wheelchair 10K races in the country and is a favorite for many racers who return year after year.

==== Wheelchair race divisions ====
The Shepherd Center and its Junior Committee fund and organize the wheelchair division race in cooperation with the Atlanta Track Club. Funding provides pre-and post-race brunches, defrayed travel and lodging expenses for racers and a $34,000 purse for winners. The Shepherd Center Wheelchair Division of AJC Peachtree Road Race racing divisions are as follows:

- Open Men’s Division
- Open Women’s Division
- Open Quad Division (some upper-body paralysis)
- T-1 Quad Division (more paralysis with limited hand function)
- Masters Division (ages 40 to 50)
- Junior Division (ages 12 to 21)
- Grand Masters (ages 50 and over)
- Push-Assist Division - Trials 2014 and 2015, officially added as a division in 2016.

=== Overseas races ===
Since 2004, satellite Peachtree Races have been held for US soldiers stationed overseas. The first race was held in Iraq. In 2007, five separate races were held on July 4 (one in Kuwait, three in Iraq, and one in Afghanistan) with a combined total of 3000 participants. The Atlanta Track Club sends race supplies, including T-shirts, to the runners.

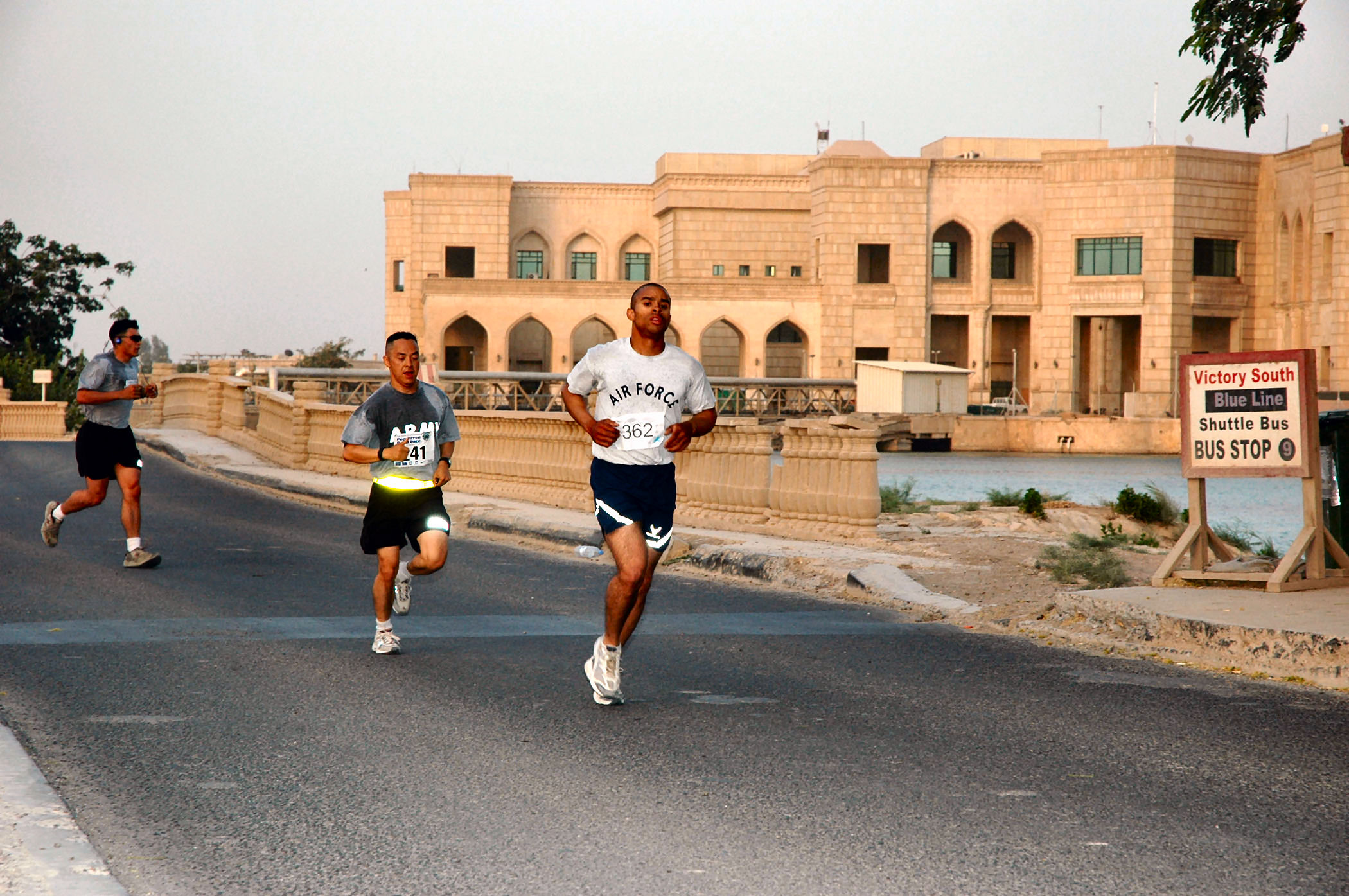
2007 running of the Peachtree Road Race in Iraq

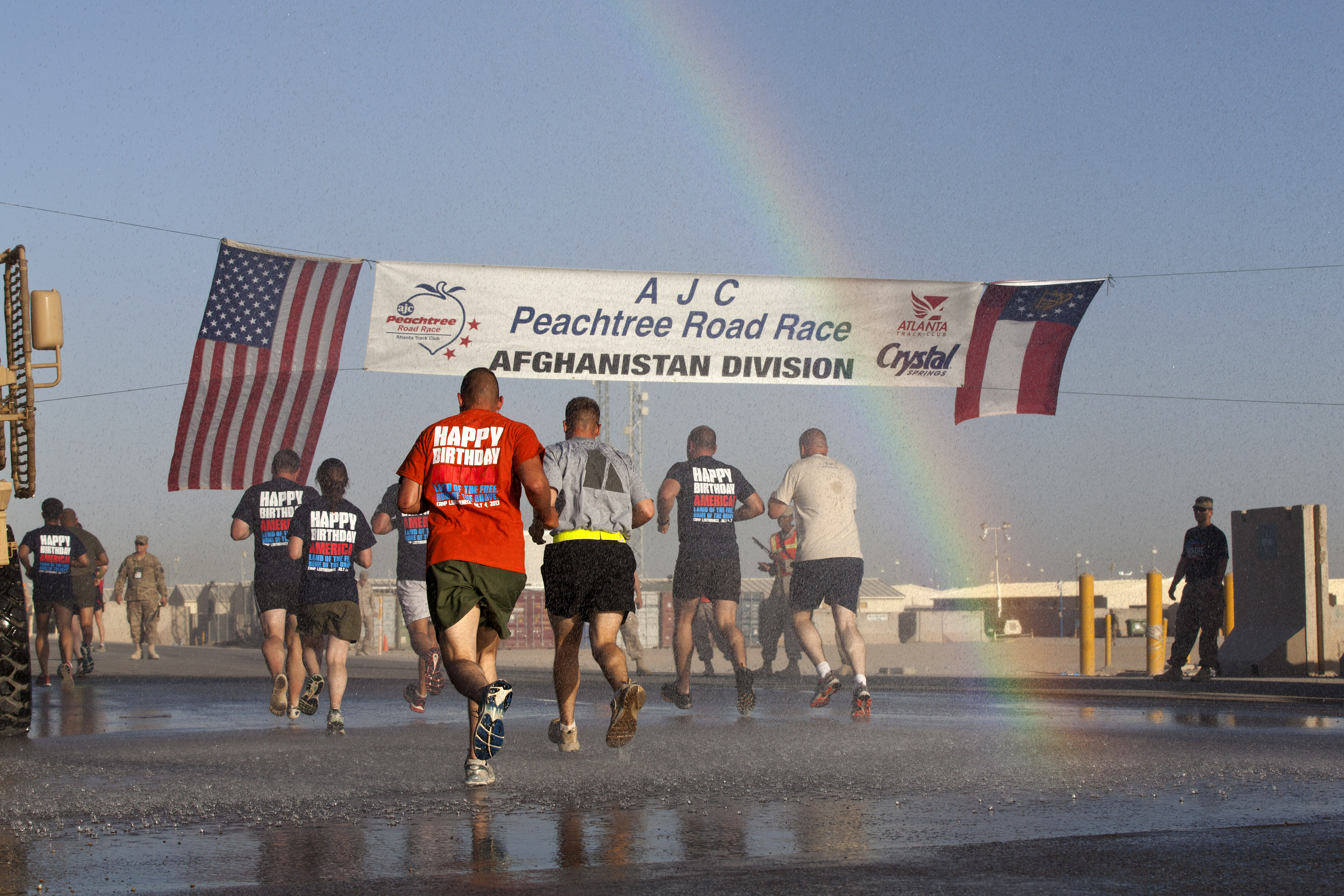
2013 running of the Peachtree Road Race in Afghanistan

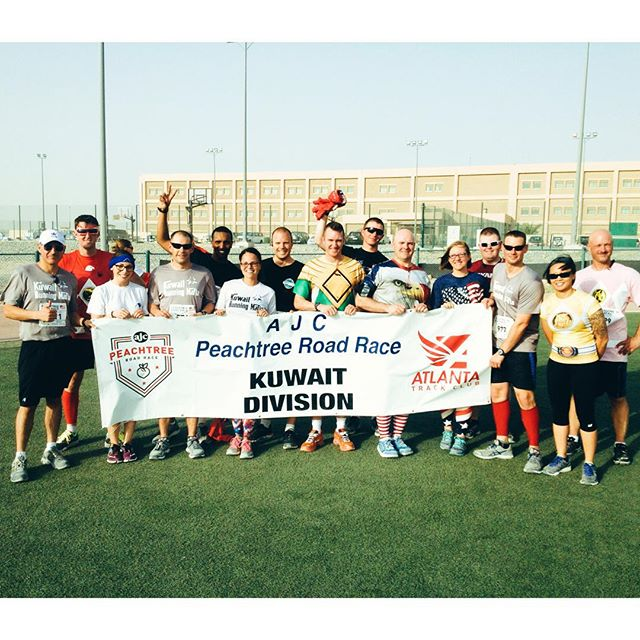
2015 running of the Peachtree Road Race in Kuwait

=== Peachtree Junior ===
Current Peachtree Junior Logo as of 2016

Started in 1987, The Peachtree Junior consists of three races:

- 3 kilometer (1.9 mi) race open to children ages 7 to 14
- 1/2 kilometre (0.31 mi) for ages 5–9
- Lil' Peach, a 50 metres (160 ft) Dash race for ages 6 & younger

Starting in 2015, ten Kid-Friendly Decathlon events were added to the Peachtree Junior. The decathlon events take place upon completion of each of the three Peachtree Junior races and are open to participants ages fourteen and under.

- 3K or 1/2K
- 40yd dash
- High jump
- Shot put
- Long jump
- Discus
- Turbo javelin
- Hurdles
- Standing broad jump
- Shuttle relay

The race is designed to be a shorter and safer version of the longer Peachtree Road Race. All race participants get the opportunity to take part in the Peachtree Jr. Challenge, which awards scholarships to the top three organizations that sign up the most kids. The event is held in late May or early June. The entire course is within the confines of Piedmont Park. The race is limited to 2,500 participants. T-shirts are given to all race finishers. The event has been held for over 20 years.

==== Peachtree Jr. course and date changes ====
For the First time ever in Peachtree Jr. history and in correlation with the 50th running of the Peachtree Road Race, 2019, the Atlanta Track Club decided to move the Peachtree Jr. permanently to July 3 as part of the Peachtree Road Race experience.

As part of the move to July 3, the course was changed to include for the first time a portion of the official Peachtree Road Race 10K course thus leaving the confines within Piedmont Park for the first time as well. The start of the course would be located at the corner of Charles Allen Drive and Piedmont Park Avenue next to the south portion of Lake Clara Meer within the Piedmont Park boundary. Runners would head west on Piedmont Park Avenue still inside Piedmont Park until they reached 12th Street Gate leaving the park. Portions of the Peachtree Road Race 10K course used for the Peachtree Jr. would be the south portion of Piedmont Avenue from the 12th Street Gate and the 10th Street portion that includes the same finish on 10th Street as the 10K .

== Past winners ==
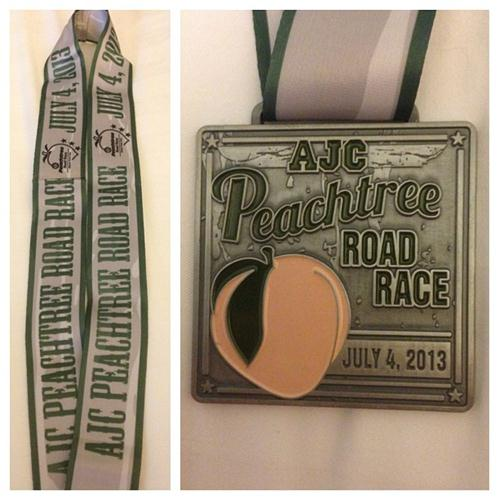
The 2013 finisher's medal, available for purchase as an additional option at registration. The coveted Peachtree T-shirt is provided to all participants who cross the finish line.

The course record for the traditional south Peachtree from Lenox Square to 10th Street is 27:04 minutes, set by Joseph Kimani in 1996. Lornah Kiplagat is the women's record holder with her run of 30:32 from 2002. The record for the wheelchair division of the Peachtree Road Race is 18:38:06 (Saul Mendoza) 2004. The women's division record is 22:09:97 (Edith Hunkler) 2009. Gayle Barron and Lornah Kiplagat are the athletes with the most victories in the history of the Peachtree Road Race. Barron won in the women's division on five occasions (1970–71, 1973–75), while Kiplagat had her victories from 2000–2002 and 2005–2006.

The north Peachtree record from 10th Street to Lenox Square is 34:57 by Lars Pöttgen, with Laura Pifer holding the women's record at 36:25, both in the inaugural 2025 race.

Key: Course record United States national championship race

| Edition | Year | Month | Men's winner | Time (m:s) | Women's winner | Time (m:s) |
|---|---|---|---|---|---|---|
| 1st | 1970 | July | Jeff Galloway (USA) | 32:21.6 | Gayle Barron (USA) | 49:13 |
| 2nd | 1971 | July | Bill Herron (USA) | 30:58 | Gayle Barron (USA) | 45:17 |
| 3rd | 1972 | July | Scott Eden (USA) | 31:10 | Gillian Valk (GB) | 47:42 |
| 4th | 1973 | July | Bill Blewett (USA) | 31:22 | Gayle Barron (USA) | 40:37 |
| 5th | 1974 | July | Wayne Roach (USA) | 30:47 | Gayle Barron (USA) | 38:40 |
| 6th | 1975 | July | Ed Leddy (IRL) | 29:52 | Gayle Barron (USA) | 38:04 |
| 7th | 1976 | July | Don Kardong (USA) | 29:14 | Janice Gage (USA) | 39:13 |
| 8th | 1977 | July | Frank Shorter (USA) | 29:20 | Peg Neppel (USA) | 36:00 |
| 9th | 1978 | July | Mike Roche (USA) | 28:59 | Mary Slaney (USA) | 33:52 |
| 10th | 1979 | July | Craig Virgin (USA) | 28:30 | Heather Carmichael (NZL) | 33:39 |
| 11th | 1980 | July | Craig Virgin (USA) | 28:39 | Patti Catalano (USA) | 32:48 |
| 12th | 1981 | July | Craig Virgin (USA) | 28:03 | Allison Roe (NZL) | 32:38 |
| 13th | 1982 | July | Jon Sinclair (USA) | 28:17 | Anne Audain (NZL) | 32:36 |
| 14th | 1983 | July | Michael Musyoki (KEN) | 28:22 | Grete Waitz (NOR) | 32:01 |
| 15th | 1984 | July | Filbert Bayi (TAN) | 28:35 | Betty Jo Geiger (USA) | 32:55 |
| 16th | 1985 | July | Michael Musyoki (KEN) | 27:58 | Grete Waitz (NOR) | 32:03 |
| 17th | 1986 | July | John Doherty (IRL) | 27:56 | Grete Waitz (NOR) | 32:10 |
| 18th | 1987 | July | Joseph Nzau (KEN) | 28:34 | Lynn Jennings (USA) | 32:22 |
| 19th | 1988 | July | Jean-Pierre Ndayisenga (BDI) | 28:17 | Grete Waitz (NOR) | 32:09 |
| 20th | 1989 | July | Ibrahim Hussein (KEN) | 28:13 | Judi St. Hilaire (USA) | 32:05 |
| 21st | 1990 | July | Dionicio Cerón (MEX) | 28:23 | Cathy O'Brien (USA) | 32:04 |
| 22nd | 1991 | July | Ed Eyestone (USA) | 28:34 | Dorthe Rasmussen (DEN) | 32:42 |
| 23rd | 1992 | July | Sammy Lelei (KEN) | 27:56 | Francie Larrieu Smith (USA) | 31:49 |
| 24th | 1993 | July | Thomas Osano (KEN) | 28:06 | Uta Pippig (GER) | 32:15 |
| 25th | 1994 | July | Benson Masya (KEN) | 28:01 | Anne-Marie Lauck (USA) | 31:57 |
| 26th | 1995 | July | Simon Morolong (RSA) | 28:00 | Joan Nesbit (USA) | 32:20 |
| 27th | 1996 | July | Joseph Kimani (KEN) | 27:04 | Hellen Kimaiyo (KEN) | 30:52 |
| 28th | 1997 | July | Joseph Kimani (KEN) | 27:43 | Hellen Kimaiyo (KEN) | 31:21 |
| 29th | 1998 | July | Khalid Khannouchi (MAR) | 27:47 | Hellen Kimaiyo (KEN) | 31:52 |
| 30th | 1999 | July | Khalid Khannouchi (MAR) | 27:45 | Elana Meyer (RSA) | 31:34 |
| 31st | 2000 | July | Alene Reta (ETH) | 28:04 | Lornah Kiplagat (KEN) | 30:52 |
| 32nd | 2001 | July | John Korir (KEN) | 28:19 | Lornah Kiplagat (KEN) | 30:58 |
| 33rd | 2002 | July | Paul Kosgei (KEN) | 27:36 | Lornah Kiplagat (KEN) | 30:32 |
| 34th | 2003 | July | Robert Cheruiyot (KEN) | 28:22.7 | Susan Chepkemei (KEN) | 31:12.1 |
| 35th | 2004 | July | Martin Lel (KEN) | 28:04 | Susan Chepkemei (KEN) | 31:55 |
| 36th | 2005 | July | Gilbert Okari (KEN) | 28:19 | Lornah Kiplagat (NED) | 31:17 |
| 37th | 2006 | July | Martin Lel (KEN) | 27:25 | Lornah Kiplagat (NED) | 31:13 |
| 38th | 2007 | July | Martin Mathathi (KEN) | 28:01 | Wude Ayalew (ETH) | 31:44 |
| 39th | 2008 | July | Terefe Maregu (ETH) | 28:30 | Nataliya Berkut (UKR) | 32:23 |
| 40th | 2009 | July | Sammy Kitwara (KEN) | 27:22 | Lineth Chepkurui (KEN) | 31:31 |
| 41st | 2010 | July | Gebre Gebremariam (ETH) | 27:56 | Lineth Chepkurui (KEN) | 30:51 |
| 42nd | 2011 | July | Sammy Kitwara (KEN) | 28:05 | Werknesh Kidane (ETH) | 31:22 |
| 43rd | 2012 | July | Peter Kirui (KEN) | 27:36 | Mamitu Daska (ETH) | 32:21 |
| 44th | 2013 | July | Mosinet Geremew (ETH) | 28:04 | Lineth Chepkurui (KEN) | 32:07 |
| 45th | 2014 | July | Christo Landry (USA) | 28:25 | Amy Hastings (USA) | 32:16 |
| 46th | 2015 | July | Scott Overall (GB) | 29:30 | Alexi Pappas (USA) | 33:28 |
| 47th | 2016 | July | Gabriel Geay (TAN) | 28:49 | Edna Kiplagat (KEN) | 32:24 |
| 48th | 2017 | July | Leonard Korir (USA) | 28:16 | Aliphine Tuliamuk (USA) | 32:49 |
| 49th | 2018 | July | Bernard Lagat (USA) | 28:45 | Stephanie Bruce (USA) | 32:21 |
| 50th | 2019 | July | Bravin Kiptoo (KEN) (Note: Rhonex Kipruto (KEN) finished first at 27:01, but was disqualified on 5 June 2024 by the Athletics Integrity Unit (AIU) after a Disciplinary Tribunal ruled irregularities in his Athlete Biological Passport (ABP) resulted from doping, specifically blood doping.) | 27:29 | Brigid Kosgei (KEN) | 30:21 |
| 51st | 2021 | July | Sam Chelanga (USA) | 28:42 | Sara Hall (USA) | 31:40 |
| 52nd | 2022 | July | Kibiwott Kandie (KEN) (Note: Rhonex Kipruto, who finished first, was disqualified on 5 June 2024 when records from 2018 to 2024 were annulled by the Athletics Integrity Unit. Kibiwott Kandie was suspended by the Athletics Integrity Unit on 14 March 2025 for evading a drug test; His Peachtree upgrade could be annulled also if 2022 results are nullified.) | 27:34 | Senbere Teferi (ETH) | 30:49 |
| 53rd | 2023 | July | Charles Langat (KEN) | 27:42 | Fotyen Tesfay (ETH) | 30:43 |
| 54th | 2024 | July | Sabastian Sawe (KEN) | 28:03 | Stacey Ndiwa (KEN) | 31:12 |
| 55th | 2025 | Jan | Lars Pöttgen (GER) | 34:57 | Laura Pifer (USA) | 36:25 |
| 55th | 2025 | July | Patrick Kiprop (KEN) | 27:35 | Hellen Obiri (KEN) | 31:29 |
| 56th | 2026 | Jan | Nathan Solomon (ERI) | 32:26 | Grace Clements (USA); Bremen, GA | 35:10 |

=== Past wheelchair division winners ===
Key: Course record United States national championship race

| Edition | Year | Men's winner | Time (m:s) | Women's winner | Time (m:s) |
|---|---|---|---|---|---|
| 1st | 1982 | George Murray (USA) | 27:38 | N/A | 00:00 |
| 2nd | 1983 | George Murray (USA) | 26:50 | Candace Cable-Brookes (USA) | 31:34 |
| 3rd | 1984 | George Murray (USA) | 26:45 | Sharon Hedrick (USA) | 29:17 |
| 4th | 1985 | George Murray (USA) | 25:24 | Candace Cable-Brookes (USA) | 30:22 |
| 5th | 1986 | Jim Martinson (USA) | 24:22 | Candace Cable-Brookes (USA) | 30:21 |
| 6th | 1987 | Craig Blanchette (USA) | 25:08 | Candace Cable-Brookes (USA) | 30:38 |
| 7th | 1988 | Mustapha Badid (FRA) | 23:00 | Candace Cable-Brookes (USA) | 27:54 |
| 8th | 1989 | Craig Blanchette (USA) | 21:52 | Sharon Hendrick (USA) | 26:48 |
| 9th | 1990 | Doug Kennedy (USA) | 21:09 | Ann Cody-Morris (USA) | 25:29 |
| 10th | 1991 | Craig Blanchette (USA) | 20:17 | Jean Driscoll (USA) | 23:46 |
| 11th | 1992 | Craig Blanchette (USA) | 20:07 | Connie Hanson (USA) | 24:01 |
| 12th | 1993 | Paul Wiggins (AUS) | 19:58 | Louise Sauvage (AUS) | 24:12 |
| 13th | 1994 | Craig Blanchette (USA) | 20:14 | Jean Driscoll (USA) | 23:13 |
| 14th | 1995 | Craig Blanchette (USA) | 20:10 | Jean Driscoll (USA) | 24:15 |
| 15th | 1996 | Paul Wiggins (AUS) | 19:29 | Jean Driscoll (USA) | 23:32 |
| 16th | 1997 | Franz Nietlispach (CH) | 19:08 | Louise Sauvage (AUS) | 25:04 |
| 17th | 1998 | Franz Nietlispach (CH) | 19:06 | Chantal Petitclerc (CAN) | 25:21 |
| 18th | 1999 | Saul Mendoza (MEX) | 19:05 | Chantal Petitclerc (CAN) | 24:13 |
| 19th | 2000 | Franz Nietlispach (CH) | 19:27 | Jean Driscoll (USA) | 24:17 |
| 20th | 2001 | Ernst van Dyk (RSA) | 18:48 | Christina Ripp (USA) | 24:29 |
| 21st | 2002 | Krige Schabort (USA) | 18:57 | Christina Ripp (USA) | 23:38 |
| 22nd | 2003 | Krige Schabort (USA) | 18:49 | Christina Ripp (USA) | 24:03 |
| 23rd | 2004 | Saul Mendoza (MEX) | 18:38:06 | Diane Roy (CAN) | 23:57:56 |
| 24th | 2005 | Kelly Smith (CAN) | 19:19:22 | Edith Hunkler (USA) | 23:18:47 |
| 25th | 2006 | Krige Schabort (USA) | 18:52:00 | Edith Hunkler (USA) | 23:22:80 |
| 26th | 2007 | Kurt Fearnley (AUS) | 19:25:90 | Amanda McGrory (USA) | 23:11:05 |
| 27th | 2008 | Kurt Fearnley (AUS) | 19:55:50 | Edith Hunkler (USA) | 24:30:20 |
| 28th | 2009 | Marcel Hug (CH) | 19:36:91 | Edith Hunkler (USA) | 22:09:97 |
| 29th | 2010 | Josh Cassidy (CAN) | 18:53:88 | Tatyana McFadden (USA) | 23:47:66 |
| 30th | 2011 | Krige Schabort (USA) | 19:47:15 | Tatyana McFadden (USA) | 23:39:26 |
| 31st | 2012 | Aaron Gordian (MEX) | 19:52:02 | Tatyana McFadden (USA) | 23:53:08 |
| 32nd | 2013 | Josh Cassidy (CAN) | 21:12:86 | Manuela Schar (CH) | 24:42:39 |
| 33rd | 2014 | Krige Schabort (USA) | 20:30:17 | Tatyana McFadden (USA) | 23:17:42 |
| 34th | 2015 | Kurt Fearnley (AUS) | 20:55:16 | Tatyana McFadden (USA) | 23:57:23 |
| 35th | 2016 | Josh George (USA) | 20:19.18 | Tatyana McFadden (USA) | 23:14.56 |
| 36th | 2017 | Daniel Romanchuk (USA) | 20:02.76 | Tatyana McFadden (USA) | 23:15.51 |
| 37th | 2018 | Daniel Romanchuk (USA) | 18:39.42 | Susannah Scaroni (USA) | 22:49.05 |
| 38th | 2019 | Daniel Romanchuk (USA) | 18:11.00 | Manuela Schar (CH) | 21:28.00 |
| 39th | 2021 | Daniel Romanchuk (USA) | 19:04.09 | Tatyana McFadden (USA) | 24:07.52 |
| 40th | 2022 | Daniel Romanchuk (USA) | 18:39.40 | Susannah Scaroni (USA) | 21:14.71 |
| 41st | 2023 | Daniel Romanchuk (USA) | 19:28 | Susannah Scaroni (USA) | 22:11 |
| 42nd | 2024 | Daniel Romanchuk (USA) | 19:37 | Susannah Scaroni (USA) | 21:39 |
| 43rd | 2025 | Daniel Romanchuk (USA) | 18:36 | Susannah Scaroni (USA) | 21:26 |
| 46th | 2026 | Daniel Romanchuk (USA) | 19:00 | Tatyana McFadden (USA) | 23:02 |

=== Past Peachtree Cup winners ===
Key: Team captain Course record

| Edition | Year | Team winner/time (m:s) | Team/Individual Men | Time (m:s) | Team/Individual Women | Time (m:s) |
|---|---|---|---|---|---|---|
| 1st | 2015 | Team Africa 3:06:29 | | | | |
| 1st | 2015 | Team Africa 3:06:29 | Daniel Salel (KEN) | 28:43 | Buze Diriba (ETH) | 32:13 |
| 1st | 2015 | Team Africa 3:06:29 | Gebre Gebremariam (ETH) | 29:42 | Caroline Kilel (KEN) | 32:30 |
| 1st | 2015 | Team Africa 3:06:29 | Lusapho April (RSA) | 29:57 | Valentine Kibet (KEN) | 33:27 |
| 2nd | 2016 | N/A | Gabriel Geay (TAN) | 28:49 | Edna Kiplagat (KEN) | 32:24 |
| 3rd | 2017 | N/A | Leonard Korir (USA) | 28:16 | Aliphine Tuliamuk (USA) | 32:49 |
| 4th | 2018 | N/A | Bernard Lagat (USA) | 28:45 | Stephanie Bruce (USA) | 32:21 |
| 5th | 2019 | N/A | Bravin Kiptoo (KEN) | 27:29 | Brigid Kosgei (KEN) | 30:21 |
| 6th | 2021 | N/A | Sam Chelanga (USA) | 28:42 | Sara Hall (USA) | 31:40 |
| 7th | 2022 | N/A | Kibowatt Kandie (KEN) | 27:34 | Senbere Teferi (ETH) | 30:49 |
