= Hannah McFadden =

American Paralympic athlete

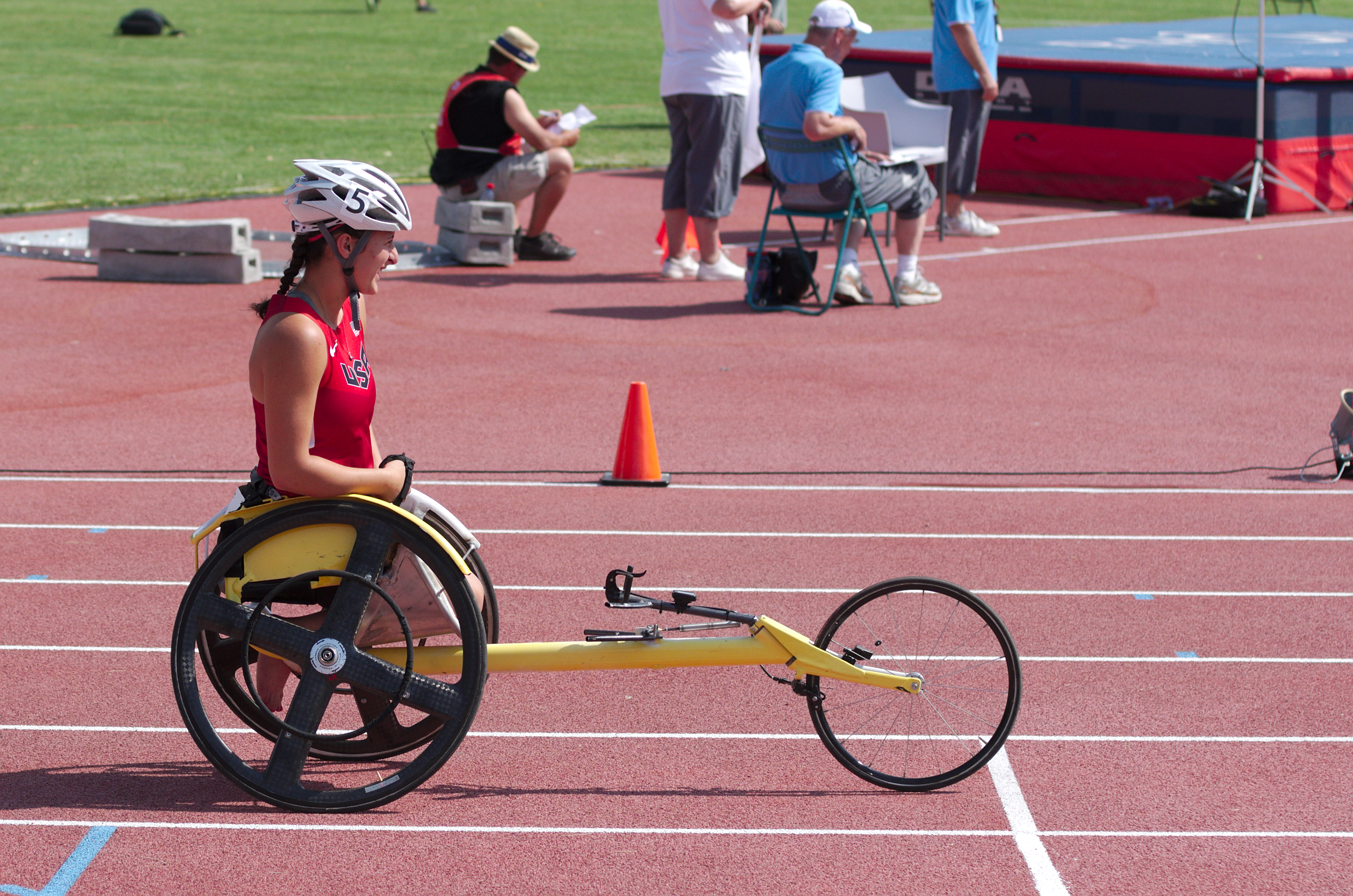

Personal information
- Born: January 23, 1996 (age 30) Durrës, Albania
- Height: 5 ft 3 in (160 cm)
- Weight: 117 lb (53 kg)

Sport
- Country: United States
- Sport: Track and field
- Disability class: T54
- Event(s): 100m, 200m, 400m
Medal record
Paralympic athletics
Representing United States
World Championships
Bronze medal – third place	2015 Doha	100m T54
Bronze medal – third place	2015 Doha	200m T54
Bronze medal – third place	2017 London	100m T54
Bronze medal – third place	2017 London	200m T54
Parapan American Games
Gold medal – first place	2015 Toronto	400m T54
Silver medal – second place	2015 Toronto	800m T54

Hannah McFadden (born January 23, 1996) is an Albanian-American Paralympic sprinter. She is the adopted daughter of Deborah McFadden and the sister of multiple-time Summer Paralympic Games gold medalist Tatyana McFadden.

When she competed with her sister at the 2012 Summer Paralympic Games, it was the first time that two siblings had ever competed together in a Paralympic Games.
