= Christo Landry =

American long-distance runner

Personal information
- Born: April 29, 1986 Madison, Wisconsin, US
- Height: 6 ft 1 in (1.85 m)
- Weight: 143 lb (65 kg)
- Website: www.christolandry.com

Sport
- Sport: Track, Long-distance running, Cross Country
- Event(s): 10,000 meters, Roads, Marathon
- College team: William & Mary
- Coached by: Alex Gibby

Achievements and titles
- Personal best(s): 5000 meters: 13:36.69; 10,000 meters: 27:55.19; Marathon: 2:14:30
- Updated on April 5, 2015

Christo Landry (born April 29, 1986) is a United States distance runner who has won multiple USA Road Championships and holds the American record in the 25 km distance.

== Education ==
Born in Madison, Wisconsin, Landry attended Thomas Jefferson High School for Science and Technology, a state-chartered magnet school in Fairfax County, Virginia. After graduating in 2004, he attended the College of William & Mary where he earned a bachelor's degree in finance and economics and a master's degree in accounting.

== Running career ==
=== High school ===
Landry ran for Thomas Jefferson High School for Science and Technology which competed in the AAA division of the Virginia High School League. While there, he led the team to the 2002 State Championship in Cross Country and a runner-up finish the following year in 2003. In 2004 he won both the 1600 meter and the 3200 meter at the outdoor state meet in times of 4:13.39 and 9:13.74.

=== Collegiate ===
At William and Mary, Landry earned three All-American awards in cross country with a highest placing of 13th (2007) at the NCAA Division I Cross Country Championships and placed 46th in the 2005 IAAF World Cross Country Championships Junior Race for the United States. On the track Landry qualified for NCAA Outdoor Championship Meet in his freshman and sophomore years in the 5,000m.

=== Post-collegiate ===
After finishing his NCAA eligibility at William and Mary, Landry moved to Ann Arbor, Michigan, and became a volunteer assistant coach for the cross country team at the University of Michigan for two years while he pursued a professional running career. His first post-collegiate breakthrough was a 28:30.07 showing in 2011 at the Payton Jordan Invitational 10,000m, his debut in the event. This success continued onto the USARC (USA Running Circuit) where he racked up four top five finishes in the next year, including a runner-up finish at the 2012 15 km Championships that would later be upgraded to a first-place finish as a result of a drug conviction of the previous winner. After the 2012 Olympic Trials, where he finished 17th following a fall in the 10,000m, Landry signed with MizunoUSA. By the end of the year he had accumulated enough points in USARC races to become the 2012 overall champion. In 2013, Landry continued to improve in the 10,000m and dipped under the 28 minute barrier for the first time.

For Landry 2014 was a breakout year as he won three USA Road Championships in a row (10 mile, 25 kilometer, and 10 kilometer), including setting the American record at 25 kilometers, and finished second in two others. This led to Landry winning the USARC overall championship for a second time.

In 2015 Landry was second place in the USATF 15 km Championships behind Ben True. Landry ran the Mt SAC Relays 5000 meter in 13:36.69 in Walnut, California, on April 17, 2015, as a tune up to Payton Jordan Invite where he ran the Olympics standard for 10,000 meters with his time of 27:55.19 at Stanford University on May 2, 2015.

== Competition record ==
=== National championships and international competition ===
==== Road ====
| Year | Competition | Venue | Position | Event | Notes |
|---|---|---|---|---|---|
| 2011 | USA 8 km Road Championships | Carmel, Indiana | 4th | 8 km | 23:16 |
| 2011 | USA 10 km Championships | Atlanta, Georgia | 5th | 10 km | 28:52 |
| 2011 | USA 20 km Road Championships | New Haven, Connecticut | 4th | 20 km | 61:17 |
| 2011 | USA 5 km Road Championships | Providence, Rhode Island | 8th | 5 km | 14:07 |
| 2011 | Izumo University Ekiden | Izumo, Japan | 9th | 8 km | 23:33 |
| 2011 | Chiba Ekiden | Chiba, Japan | 7th | 10 km | 30:00 |
| 2012 | USA 15km Road Championships | Jacksonville, Florida | 1st | 15 km | 44:37 |
| 2012 | USA 25 km Road Championships | Grand Rapids, Michigan | 2nd | 25 km | 1:15:47 |
| 2012 | USA 20 km Road Championships | New Haven, Connecticut | 7th | 20 km | 60:04 |
| 2012 | USA 5 km Road Championships | Providence, Rhode Island | 10th | 5 km | 14:12 |
| 2012 | USA 10 mi Road Championships | St. Paul, Minnesota | 8th | 10 mi | 47:52 |
| 2013 | USA 15km Road Championships | Jacksonville, Florida | 5th | 15 km | 43:46 |
| 2013 | USA 25 km Road Championships | Grand Rapids, Michigan | 3rd | 25 km | 1:15:00 |
| 2013 | USA Marathon Championships | St. Paul, Minnesota | 5th | Marathon | 2:14:44 |
| 2013 | USA 12 km Road Championships | Alexandria, Virginia | 4th | 12 km | 34:40 |
| 2014 | USA 15km Road Championships | Jacksonville, Florida | 4th | 15 km | 43:58 |
| 2014 | USA 10mi Road Championships | Washington, D.C. | 1st | 10 mi | 46:41 |
| 2014 | USA 25 km Road Championships | Grand Rapids, Michigan | 1st | 25 km | 1:14:18 |
| 2014 | USA 10km Road Championships | Atlanta, Georgia | 1st | 10 km | 28:25 |
| 2014 | USA 7 mile Championships | Davenport, Iowa | 2nd | 7 mi | 33:32 |
| 2014 | USA 20 km Road Championships | New Haven, Connecticut | 2nd | 20 km | 61:27 |
| 2014 | USA 12 km Road Championships | Alexandria, Virginia | 8th | 12 km | 34:42 |
| 2014 | Chiba Ekiden | Chiba, Japan | 5th | 10 km | 28:55 |
| 2015 | USA 15km Road Championships | Jacksonville, Florida | 2nd | 15 km | 44:14 |
| 2015 | USA 25 km Road Championships | Grand Rapids, Michigan | 2nd | 25 km | 1:15:01 |
| 2016 | USA 15km Road Championships | Jacksonville, Florida | 3rd | 15 km | 44:42 |
| 2016 | USA 1/2 Marathon Road Championships | Columbus, Ohio | 1st | 1/2 Marathon | 62:52 |
| 2016 | USA 25 km Road Championships | Grand Rapids, Michigan | 1st | 25 km | 1:15:32 |
| 2017 | USA 1/2 Marathon Road Championships | Columbus, Ohio | 3rd | 1/2 Marathon | 63:13 |
| 2017 | USA 25 km Road Championships | Grand Rapids, Michigan | 2nd | 25 km | 1:14:51 |
| 2017 | USA 20 km Road Championships | New Haven, Connecticut | 4th | 20 km | 60:36 |

Key: American Record

==== Track and field ====
| Year | Competition | Venue | Position | Event | Notes |
|---|---|---|---|---|---|
| 2011 | 2011 USA Outdoor Track and Field Championships | Eugene, Oregon | 12th | 10,000 m | 28:54.94 |
| 2012 | USA Olympic Trials | Eugene, Oregon | 17th | 10,000 m | 28:35.46 |
| 2013 | 2013 USA Outdoor Track and Field Championships | Des Moines, Iowa | 12th | 10,000 m | 29:38.82 |
| 2015 | 2015 USA Outdoor Track and Field Championships | Eugene, Oregon | 20th | 10,000 m | 29:40.49 |
| 2016 | 2016 United States Olympic Trials (track and field) | Eugene, Oregon | 15th | 10,000 m | 29:27.15 |

==== Cross country ====
| Year | Competition | Venue | Position | Event | Notes |
|---|---|---|---|---|---|
| 2012 | USA Cross Country Championships | St. Louis, Missouri | 7th | 12 km | 36:28 |
| 2012 | NACAC Cross Country Championships | Port of Spain, Trinidad and Tobago | 2nd | 8 km | 24:10 |
| 2014 | USA Cross Country Championships | Boulder, Colorado | 16th | 12 km | 38:07 |
| 2016 | USA Cross Country Championships | Bend, Oregon | 10th | 10 km | 32:45 |
