= Mitsubishi Electric America Foundation =

Mitsubishi Electric America Foundation (MEAF) was established in 1991 by Mitsubishi Electric Corporation of Japan and the Mitsubishi Electric US group companies, which manufacture, market and distribute a wide range of consumer, industrial, commercial and professional electronics products. Based in the Washington D.C. area, MEAF works to make societal changes by investing in innovative strategies to empower youth with disabilities to lead productive lives. The Foundation supports national grant programs and employee volunteer programs across the United States. Since its inception, the Foundation has contributed more than $9 million to organizations assisting young people with disabilities.

== Projects ==
Washington, D.C.–based American Association of People with Disabilities (AAPD) is using a three-year grant from MEAF for its Summer Internship Program. AAPD places college students with disabilities in summer internships on Capitol Hill.

MEAF is providing a three-year grant to support the Girl Scout Council of the Nation's Capital for its Include All Girls Initiative. This initiative helps promote the full inclusion of girls with disabilities in Girl Scouting, and helps develop their leadership skills for the future.

MEAF is engaged in a three-year project between the Tarjan Center at UCLA and Students for the Advancement of Global Entrepreneurship (SAGE) to Include All Students in Entrepreneurial Leadership Programs. This program provides opportunities for youth with disabilities to build their entrepreneurial acumen.

The American Association of People with Disabilities is currently using a two-year grant from MEAF to expand Disability Mentoring Day into a Pipelines of Talent Project.

MEAF has provided two years of funding for the Autistic Self Advocacy Network to support its Autistic Campus Leadership Academy for autistic college students. The students develop their self-advocacy skills, and then put those skills into action to create more inclusive college campuses.

In 2016, MEAF supported a new film project Intelligent Lives by Dan Habib with $200,000. The film is about people with intellectual disabilities and how they were separated, the dismantling of separation and about people with mental disabilities, who break new ground.

== New grants in 2012–2013 ==
The US Business Leadership Network, which is working in partnership with the Employer Assistance & Resource Network (EARN), received a grant from MEAF to develop a two-year Career Link Mentoring Program. The program places college students and recent graduates with disabilities in a mentoring relationship with business professionals.

MEAF is providing a two-year grant to the US International Council on Disability to establish a Youth in Development Internship Program The program places college students with disabilities in summer internships with international affairs organizations.

The Cincinnati Children's Hospital Medical Center is using an MEAF grant to support the Project SEARCH Training Institute, which gathers and shares best practices related to placing students with severe disabilities in competitive jobs.

MEAF is providing a two-year grant to Wilderness Inquiry for Project WILD. The project provides adventure leadership training to high school students with intellectual disabilities to help them build their confidence and leadership skills.

== Awards and recognition ==
2010: Council on Foundations presented the Wilmer Shields Rich Award for Excellence in Communications Gold Award for Websites to the Mitsubishi Electric America Foundation

2006: Disability Funders Network presented The William Diaz Impact Award to the Mitsubishi Electric America Foundation

2000: American Foundation for the Blind presented the Helen Keller Achievement Award to Kiyoshi Kawakami, president & CEO, Mitsubishi Electric US, Inc. and president, Mitsubishi Electric America Foundation
