= Shepherd Center =

Specialty hospital in Atlanta, Georgia

Geography
- Location: 2020 Peachtree Road, Atlanta, Georgia, U.S.
- Coordinates: 33.8240072°N 84.387474°W

Organisation
- Type: Specialist

Services
- Beds: 152-bed rehabilitation facility 10-bed Intensive Care Unit
- Speciality: Spinal cord injury

History
- Founded: 1975

Links
- Website: shepherd.org
- Lists: Hospitals in U.S.

The Shepherd Center, located in Atlanta, Georgia, is a private, not-for-profit hospital specializing in medical treatment, research, and rehabilitation for people with complex conditions, including spinal cord injury, acquired brain injury, multi-trauma, traumatic amputations, stroke, multiple sclerosis, chronic pain, and other neuromuscular conditions.

== History ==
Shepherd Center was founded in 1975 when Harold and Alana Shepherd traveled to find care for their son James, who was paralyzed from the neck down in a body surfing accident in Rio de Janeiro. Unable to find appropriate rehabilitation measures, the Shepherds began recruiting support from old friends in the community, then from every individual, foundation, and corporation who might help fund Shepherd Center.

James served as chairman of the board of the center prior to his death in December 2019. Alana Shepherd currently serves as the Chairperson of the Board of Directors.

== Programs ==
Shepherd Center has led to the development of specialized treatment programs for adolescent patients (ages 12–17), adults, seniors (ages 50 and older), dual diagnosis patients, intensive care unit patients, and those with neuromuscular disorders. Shepherd Center offers rehabilitation for people who have had brain injuries, as well as people who have had complications from a stroke or tumor.

The Multiple Sclerosis (MS) Institute at Shepherd is a treatment and rehabilitation center for people with multiple sclerosis.

== Research ==
The Virginia C. Crawford Research Institute at Shepherd Center conducts neurological and neuromuscular research. Shepherd Center's research activities primarily focus on spinal cord injury, brain injury, multiple sclerosis and neuromuscular disorders.

Since 1982, Shepherd Center has been designated as a Model System of Care for spinal cord injury by the U.S. Department of Education’s National Institute on Disability and Rehabilitation Research (NIDRR).

In 2022, the Administration for Community Living’s (ACL) National Institute on Disability, Independent Living, and Rehabilitation Research (NIDILRR) awarded a five-year grant to Shepherd Center. It recognized the rehabilitation hospital as a Traumatic Brain Injury Model System (TBIMS). It will officially be known as Georgia Model Brain Injury System at Shepherd Center.

== Accreditation ==
Shepherd Center is accredited by The Joint Commission and the Commission on Accreditation of Rehabilitation Facilities (CARF).

== See also ==
- Peachtree Road Race - the Shepherd Center Wheelchair Division of AJC Peachtree Road Race founded in 1982.
