= Krige Schabort =

South African Paralympic athlete

Personal information
- Born: 9 September 1963 (age 62)
Medal record
Men's para athletics
Representing South Africa
Paralympic Games
Silver medal – second place	2000 Sydney	Marathon T54
Men's paratriathlon
Representing United States
World Championships
Gold medal – first place	2014 Edmonton	PT1
Silver medal – second place	2015 Chicago	PT1
Silver medal – second place	2016 Rotterdam	PT1
Bronze medal – third place	2013 London	TRI 1
Americas Championships
Gold medal – first place	2015 Monterrey	PT1
Gold medal – first place	2016 Sarasota	PT1

Krige Schabort (born 9 September 1963) is a paralympic athlete from South Africa competing mainly in category T54 distance events. He started to represent the US after 2012.

== Biography ==
Krige competed in the 1500m, 5000m, 10000m and marathon at the 2000 Summer Paralympics winning the silver medal in the T54 marathon. This was a feat he could not match in 2004 when competing in the 5000m, 10000m and marathon he failed to medal. He moved to America in 2012 and now represents United States at the Paralympics.

Schabort is a five-time Falmouth Road Race champion in the wheelchair division, winning most recently on August 12, 2012, with a time of 23 minutes, 53 seconds. He also won the Falmouth Mile race the night before, with a time of 3:20.

He lost his legs in 1987 during the South African Border War.
