= Athletics at the 2024 Summer Paralympics – Men's marathon =

Athletics – Men's marathon at the XVII Paralympic Games
- Venue: Stade de France
- Dates: 8 September 2024
- No. of events: 2

Marathon at the 2024 Summer Paralympics
Men's · T12 · T54 · Women's · T12 · T54

The Men's marathon athletics events for the 2024 Summer Paralympics took place in Paris on 8 September 2024. A total of 2 events were contested over this distance.

== Schedule ==
Date	Sun 8
Event M	M
T12 Marathon	F
T54 Marathon	F

== Medal summary ==
The following is a summary of the medals awarded across all Marathon events.

Classification	Gold		Silver		Bronze	
T12	Wajdi Boukhili; Tunisia	2:22:05	Alberto Suarez Laso; Spain	2:24:02	El Amin Chentouf; Morocco	2:24:02
T54	Marcel Hug; Switzerland	1:27:29	Jin Hua; China	1:31.19	Tomoki Suzuki; Japan	1:31.23

=== T12 ===
The T12 category is for athletes with visual impairment. Athletes in this category will generally have some residual sight, the ability to recognise the shape of a hand at a distance of 2 metres and the ability to perceive clearly will be no more than 2/60. T12 athletes commonly run with guides.

The event in this classification took place on 8 September 2024.

Rank	Class	Athlete	Nation	Time	Notes
1st place, gold medalist(s)	T12	Wajdi Boukhili	Tunisia	2:22:05	SB
2nd place, silver medalist(s)	T12	Alberto Suarez Laso	Spain	2:24:02	SB
3rd place, bronze medalist(s)	T12	El Amin Chentouf	Morocco	2:24:02	SB
4	T12	Denis Gavrilov	Neutral Paralympic Athletes	2:25:22	
5	T12	Hatem Nasrallah	Tunisia	2:27:58	SB
6	T12	Sixto Roman Moreta Criollo	Ecuador	2:27:59	SB
7	T12	Tadashi Horikoshi	Japan	2:28:03	
8	T12	Gustavo Nieves	Spain	2:29:26	SB
9	T11	Shinya Wada	Japan	2:29:59	PR, YC R49.8(h)
10	T12	Yutaka Kumagai	Japan	2:32:26	
11	T12	Martin Clobert	Belgium	2:38:34	SB
—	T11	Rosbil Guillen	Peru	DQ	DQ R49.6(b)

Notes: Yellow Card - Shinya Wada - R49.8(h) - Collecting refreshment/water from non-official station or person or takes refreshment of another athlete and/or guide runner.

DQ - Rosbil Guillen - R49.6(b) - Athlete must cross the finish line in front of the guide runner

=== T54 ===
The T54 category is for wheelchair athletes with no leg function, but near full arm function and reasonable to normal trunk function. Typically this may be caused by a lower spinal cord injury or spinal cord birth defect.

The final in this classification took place on 8 September 2024:

Rank	Class	Athlete	Nation	Time	Notes
1st place, gold medalist(s)	T54	Marcel Hug	Switzerland	1:27:39	
2nd place, silver medalist(s)	T54	Jin Hua	China	1:31:19	SB
3rd place, bronze medalist(s)	T54	Tomoki Suzuki	Japan	1:31:23	
4	T54	Daniel Romanchuk	United States	1:32:23	
5	T54	David Weir	Great Britain	1:32:27	
6	T54	Luo Xiangchuan	China	1:36:20	SB
7	T54	Aaron Pike	United States	1:36:23	
8	T54	Ryota Yoshida	Japan	1:37:15	
9	T54	Jetze Plat	Netherlands	1:39:47	SB
10	T54	Francisco Sanclemente	Colombia	1:46:27	
11	T53	Brian Siemann	United States	1:51:56	
12	T53	Yoo Byunghoon	South Korea	1:52:05	SB
—	T54	Ma Zhuo	China	DNF	
