= Athletics at the 2024 Summer Paralympics – Men's marathon T12 =

Men's marathon T12 at the XVII Paralympic Games
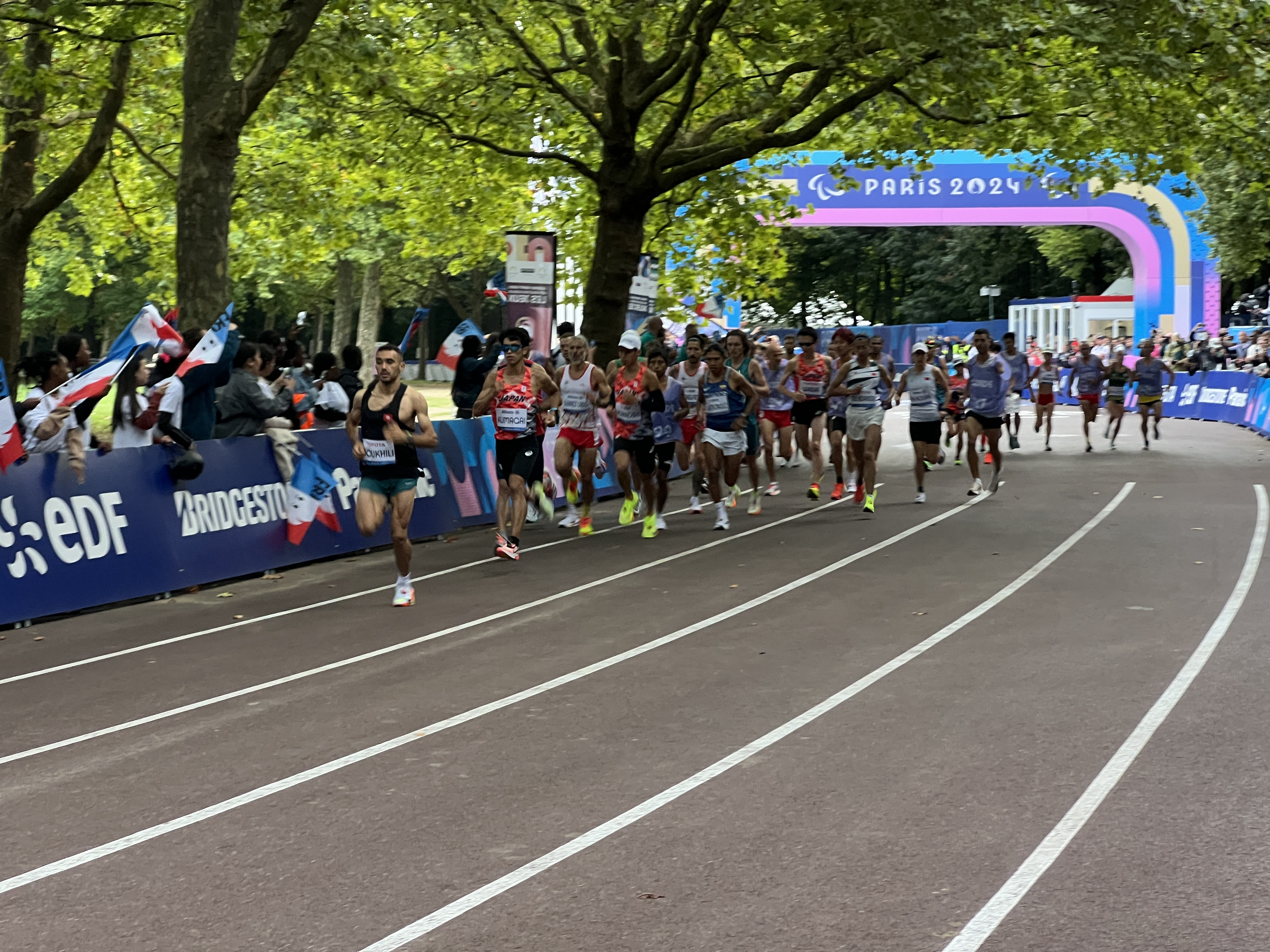
- Start of the race at Georges Valbon park.
- Venue: Les Invalides, Paris, France
- Dates: 8 September 2024
- Competitors: 12 from 8 nations
- Winning time: 2:22:05

Medalists
1st place, gold medalist(s)		Wajdi Boukhili	Tunisia
2nd place, silver medalist(s)		Alberto Suarez Laso	Spain
3rd place, bronze medalist(s)		El Amin Chentouf	Morocco

Marathon at the 2024 Summer Paralympics
Men's · T12 · T54 · Women's · T12 · T54

The men's marathon T12 event at the 2024 Summer Paralympics in Paris, took place on 8 September 2024.

== Classification ==
The event is open to T11 and T12 classified athletes.T11 is for visually impaired athletes with a LogMAR score of 2.60 and above. T12 is for visually impaired athletes with a LogMAR range from 1.50-2.60, and/or a maximum visual acuity range of 10 degrees. Athletes may choose to run with a guide.

== Records ==
Prior to the competition, the existing records were as follows: T11 Records

World record	Shinya Wada (JPN)	2:23:27	(Japan) Ōita	4 February 2024
Paralympic record	Shinya Wada (JPN)	2:33:05	(Japan) Tokyo	5 September 2021

T12 Records

World record	Jaryd Clifford (AUS)	2:19:08	(Australia) Sydney	25 April 2021
Paralympic record	El Amin Chentouf (MAR)	2:21:43	(Japan) Tokyo	5 September 2021

== Results ==
=== Final ===
The event took place on 8 September 2024:

Rank	Class	Athlete	Nation	Time	Notes
1st place, gold medalist(s)	T12	Wajdi Boukhili	Tunisia	2:22:05	SB
2nd place, silver medalist(s)	T12	Alberto Suarez Laso	Spain	2:24:02	SB
3rd place, bronze medalist(s)	T12	El Amin Chentouf	Morocco	2:24:02	SB
4	T12	Denis Gavrilov	Neutral Paralympic Athletes	2:25:22	
5	T12	Hatem Nasrallah	Tunisia	2:27:58	SB
6	T12	Sixto Roman Moreta Criollo	Ecuador	2:27:59	SB
7	T12	Tadashi Horikoshi	Japan	2:28:03	
8	T12	Gustavo Nieves	Spain	2:29:26	SB
9	T11	Shinya Wada	Japan	2:29:59	PR, YC R49.8(h)
10	T12	Yutaka Kumagai	Japan	2:32:26	
11	T12	Martin Clobert	Belgium	2:38:34	SB
—	T11	Rosbil Guillen	Peru	DQ	DQ R49.6(b)

Notes: Yellow Card - Shinya Wada - R49.8(h) - Collecting refreshment/water from non-official station or person or takes refreshment of another athlete and/or guide runner.

DQ - Rosbil Guillen - R49.6(b) - Athlete must cross the finish line in front of the guide runner
