= Sanclemente =

Sanclemente is a surname. Notable people with the surname include:

- Angie Sanclemente Valencia (born 1979), Colombian beauty queen and lingerie model
- Francisco Sanclemente, Colombian Paralympian
- Manuel Antonio Sanclemente (1814–1902), Colombian politician
