= Athletics at the 2024 Summer Paralympics – Women's marathon =

Athletics – Women's marathon at the XVII Paralympic Games
- Venue: Stade de France
- Dates: 8 September 2024
- No. of events: 2

Marathon at the 2024 Summer Paralympics
Men's · T12 · T54 · Women's · T12 · T54

The women's marathon athletics events for the 2024 Summer Paralympics took place in Paris on 8 September 2024. A total of 2 events were contested over this distance.

== Schedule ==
Date	Sun 8
Event M	M
T12 Marathon	F
T54 Marathon	F

== Medal summary ==
The following is a summary of the medals awarded across all Marathon events.

Classification	Gold		Silver		Bronze	
T12	Fatima Ezzahra El Idrissi; Morocco	2:48.36 WR	Meryem En-Nourhi; Guide: Abdelhadi El Harti; Morocco	2:58.15	Misato Michishita; Japan	3:04:24
T54	Catherine Debrunner; Switzerland	1:41:50	Madison de Rozario; Australia	1:46:13	Susannah Scaroni; United States	1:46:29

=== T12 ===
The T12 category is for athletes with visual impairment. Athletes in this category will generally have some residual sight, the ability to recognise the shape of a hand at a distance of 2 metres and the ability to perceive clearly will be no more than 2/60. T12 athletes commonly run with guides.

The event in this classification took place on 8 September 2024.

Rank	Class	Athlete	Nation	Time	Notes
1st place, gold medalist(s)	T12	Fatima Ezzahra El Idrissi	Morocco	2:48:36	WR
2nd place, silver medalist(s)	T12	Meryem En-Nourhi; Guide: Abdelhadi El Harti	Morocco	2:58:18	PB
3rd place, bronze medalist(s)	T12	Misato Michishita	Japan	3:04:23	SB
4	T12	Rosario Gangloff	France	3:13:50	
5	T12	Edneusa de Jesus Santos; Guide: Allesandro Souza	Brazil	3:17:40	
6	T12	Ausra Garunksnyte; Guide: Linas Mikalainis	Lithuania	3:18:41	SB
7	T11	Louzanne Coetzee; Guide: Claus Kempen	South Africa	3:25:53	SB
8	T12	Maria del Carmen Paredes Rodriguez; Guide: Lorenzo Sanchez Martin	Spain	3:36:29	
—	T12	Elena Congost; Guide: Mia Carol Bruguera	Spain	DQ	R7.9.5
—	T11	He Shanshan	China	DQ	R49.6(b)

Notes: He Shansan-R49.6(b) - Athlete must cross the finish line in front of the guide runner

Elena Congost-R7.9.5 - Failure of athlete/guide runner to comply with Rule 7.9 (i.e. releasing tether before finish, shortening tether)

=== T54 ===
The T54 category is for wheelchair athletes with no leg function, but near full arm function and reasonable to normal trunk function. Typically this may be caused by a lower spinal cord injury or spinal cord birth defect.

The final in this classification took place on 8 September 2024:

Rank	Class	Athlete	Nation	Time	Notes
1st place, gold medalist(s)	T53	Catherine Debrunner	Switzerland	1:41:50	
2nd place, silver medalist(s)	T53	Madison de Rozario	Australia	1:46:13	
3rd place, bronze medalist(s)	T53	Susannah Scaroni	United States	1:46:29	
4	T54	Manuela Schaer	Switzerland	1:49:22	
5	T54	Zhou Zhaoqian	China	1:52:09	SB
6	T54	Wakako Tsuchida	Japan	1:52:39	
7	T53	Tatyana McFadden	United States	1:53:52	
8	T54	Aline Rocha	Brazil	1:53:54	
9	T54	Merle Menje	Germany	1:55:54	
10	T54	Vanessa Cristina de Souza	Brazil	1:56:33	
11	T54	Patricia Eachus	Switzerland	2:01:39	
12	T54	Tsubasa Kina	Japan	2:04:53	
13	T54	Jenna Fesemyer	United States	2:05:42	
14	T54	Noemi Alphonse	Mauritius	2:07:59	
15	T54	Tian Yajuan	China	2:12:51	SB
—	T54	Eden Rainbow-Cooper	Great Britain	DNF	
