= Shu Watanabe =

Shu Watanabe may refer to:

- Shu Watanabe (politician), Japanese politician
- Shu Watanabe (actor), Japanese actor

== See also ==
- Sho Watanabe, Japanese wheelchair racer
