= Athletics at the 2024 Summer Paralympics – Women's marathon T12 =

Women's marathon T12 at the XVII Paralympic Games
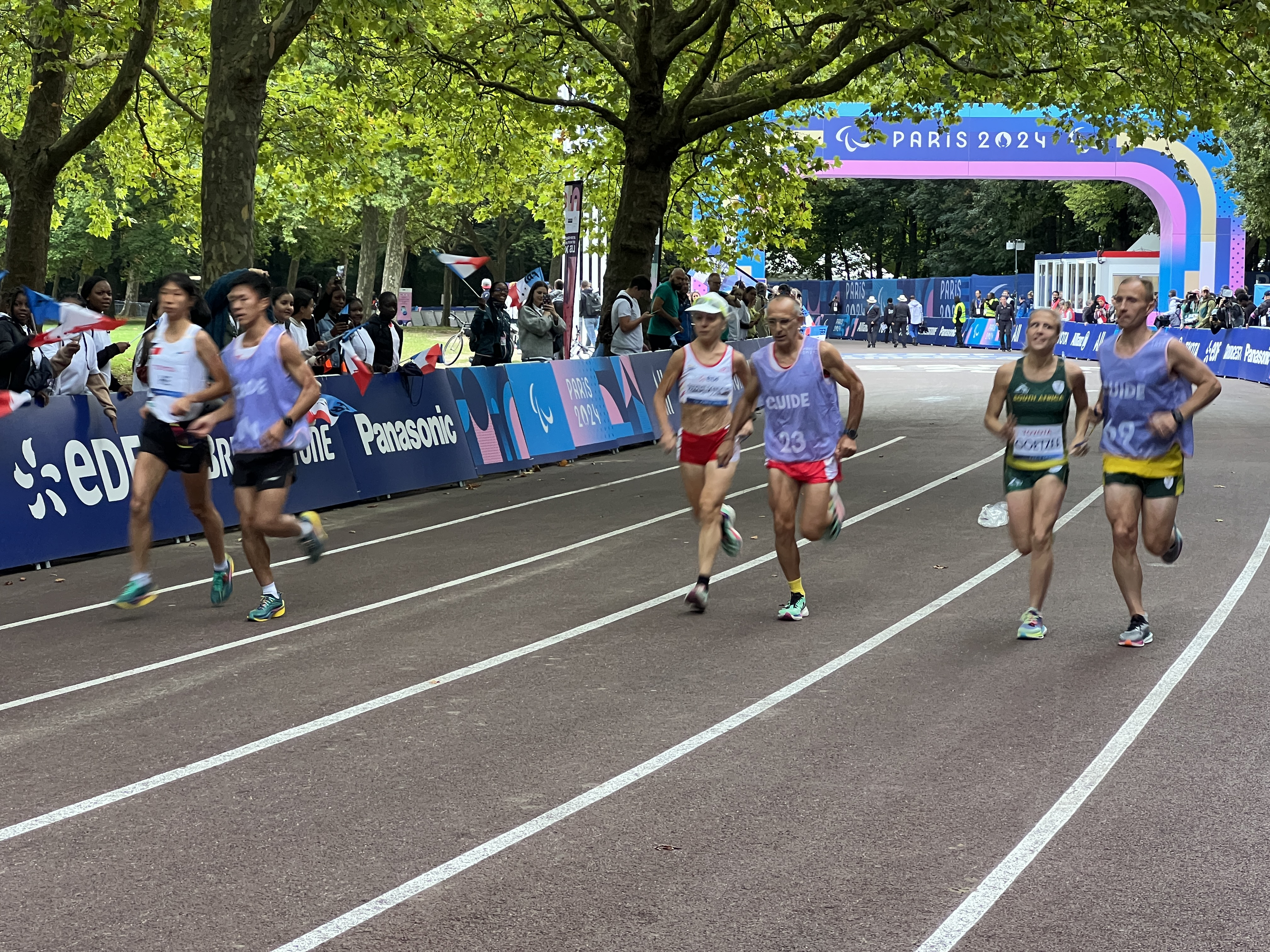
- Start of the race at Georges Valbon park.
- Venue: Les Invalides, Paris, France
- Dates: 8 September 2024
- Competitors: 10 from 8 nations
- Winning time: 2:48:36 WR

Medalists
1st place, gold medalist(s)		Fatima Ezzahra El Idrissi	Morocco
2nd place, silver medalist(s)		Meryem En-Nourhi; Guide: Abdelhadi El Harti	Morocco
3rd place, bronze medalist(s)		Misato Michishita	Japan

Marathon at the 2024 Summer Paralympics
Men's · T12 · T54 · Women's · T12 · T54

The women's marathon T12 event at the 2024 Summer Paralympics in Paris, took place on 8 September 2024.

== Classification ==
The event is open to T11 and T12 classified athletes.T11 is for visually impaired athletes with a LogMAR score of 2.60 and above. T12 is for visually impaired athletes with a LogMAR range from 1.50-2.60, and/or a maximum visual acuity range of 10 degrees. Athletes may choose to run with a guide.

== Records ==
Prior to the competition, the existing records were as follows: T11 Records

World record	Louzanne Coetzee (RSA)	3:11:13	(Japan) Tokyo	5 September 2021
Paralympic record	Louzanne Coetzee (RSA)	3:11:13	(Japan) Tokyo	5 September 2021

T12 Records

World record	Misato Michishita (JPN)	2:54:13	(Japan) Hōfu	20 December 2020
Paralympic record	Misato Michishita (JPN)	3:00:50	(Japan) Tokyo	5 September 2021

== Results ==
=== Final ===
The event took place on 8 September 2024:

Rank	Class	Athlete	Nation	Time	Notes
1st place, gold medalist(s)	T12	Fatima Ezzahra El Idrissi	Morocco	2:48:36	WR
2nd place, silver medalist(s)	T12	Meryem En-Nourhi; Guide: Abdelhadi El Harti	Morocco	2:58:18	PB
3rd place, bronze medalist(s)	T12	Misato Michishita	Japan	3:04:23	SB
4	T12	Rosario Gangloff	France	3:13:50	
5	T12	Edneusa de Jesus Santos; Guide: Allesandro Souza	Brazil	3:17:40	
6	T12	Ausra Garunksnyte; Guide: Linas Mikalainis	Lithuania	3:18:41	SB
7	T11	Louzanne Coetzee; Guide: Claus Kempen	South Africa	3:25:53	SB
8	T12	Maria del Carmen Paredes Rodriguez; Guide: Lorenzo Sanchez Martin	Spain	3:36:29	
—	T12	Elena Congost; Guide: Mia Carol Bruguera	Spain	DQ	R7.9.5
—	T11	He Shanshan	China	DQ	R49.6(b)

Notes: He Shansan-R49.6(b) - Athlete must cross the finish line in front of the guide runner

Elena Congost-R7.9.5 - Failure of athlete/guide runner to comply with Rule 7.9 (i.e. releasing tether before finish, shortening tether)
