= Athletics at the 2024 Summer Paralympics – Men's marathon T54 =

Men's marathon T54 at the XVII Paralympic Games
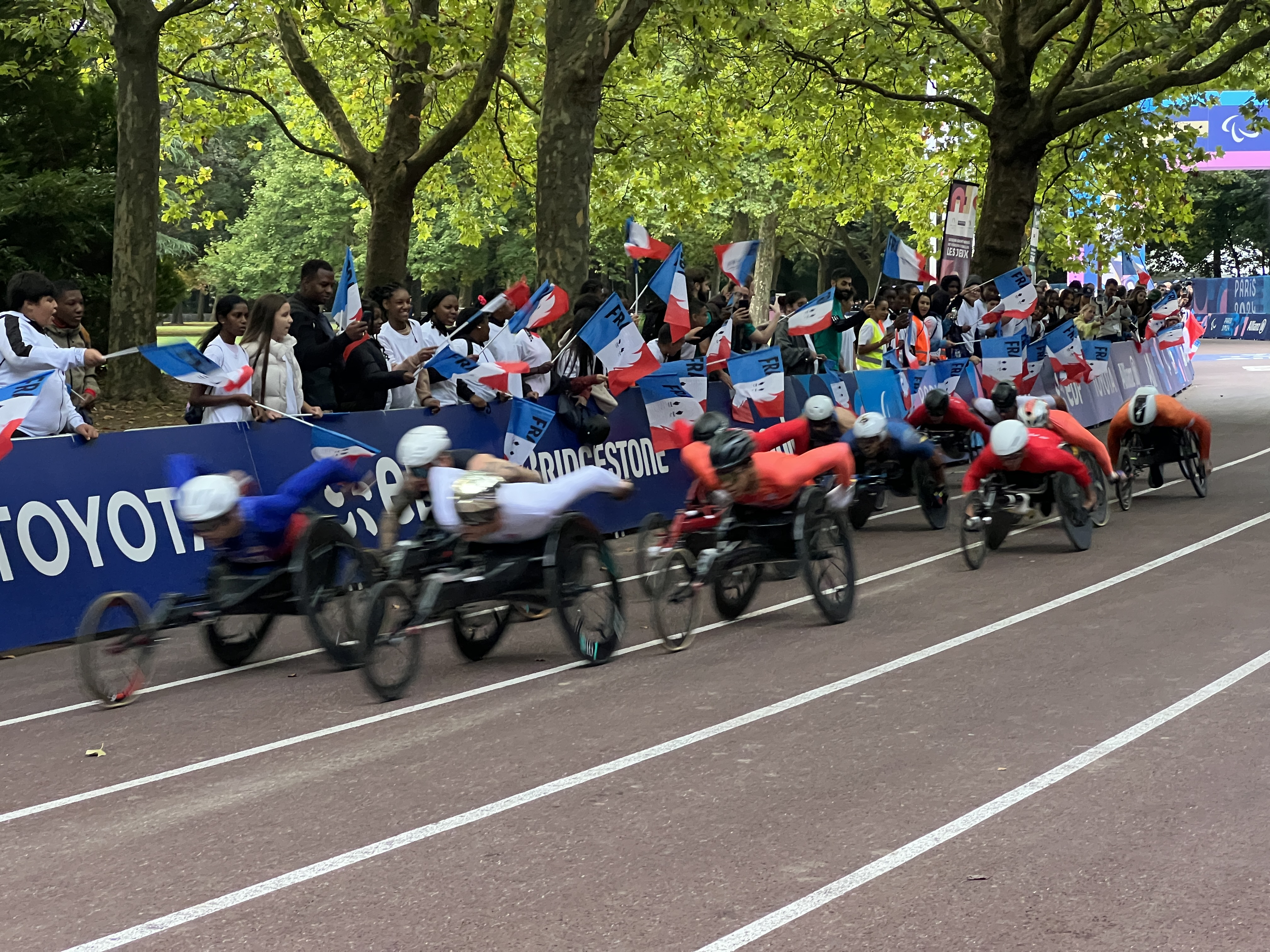
- Start of the race at Georges Valbon park.
- Venue: Les Invalides, Paris, France
- Dates: 8 September 2024
- Competitors: 13 from 8 nations
- Winning time: 1:27:39

Medalists
1st place, gold medalist(s)		Marcel Hug	Switzerland
2nd place, silver medalist(s)		Jin Hua	China
3rd place, bronze medalist(s)		Tomoki Suzuki	Japan

Marathon at the 2024 Summer Paralympics
Men's · T12 · T54 · Women's · T12 · T54

The Men's marathon T54 at the 2024 Summer Paralympics took place on 8 September at Les Invalides in Paris.

== Records ==
T53/54 Records

World record	Marcel Hug (SUI)	1:17:47	(Japan) Ōita	9 May 2024
Paralympic record	Kurt Fearnley (AUS)	1:23:17	(China) Beijing	17 September 2008

== Classification ==
The T53/54 classification is for wheelchair athletes with strong arm and torso movement, who have an impairment in their legs. Athletes have fast acceleration, can maintain top speed and maintain their pushing speed while steering.

== Results ==
The event took place on 8 September 2024.

Rank	Class	Athlete	Nation	Time	Notes
1st place, gold medalist(s)	T54	Marcel Hug	Switzerland	1:27:39	
2nd place, silver medalist(s)	T54	Jin Hua	China	1:31:19	SB
3rd place, bronze medalist(s)	T54	Tomoki Suzuki	Japan	1:31:23	
4	T54	Daniel Romanchuk	United States	1:32:23	
5	T54	David Weir	Great Britain	1:32:27	
6	T54	Luo Xiangchuan	China	1:36:20	SB
7	T54	Aaron Pike	United States	1:36:23	
8	T54	Ryota Yoshida	Japan	1:37:15	
9	T54	Jetze Plat	Netherlands	1:39:47	SB
10	T54	Francisco Sanclemente	Colombia	1:46:27	
11	T53	Brian Siemann	United States	1:51:56	
12	T53	Yoo Byunghoon	South Korea	1:52:05	SB
—	T54	Ma Zhuo	China	DNF	
