= Athletics at the 2020 Summer Paralympics – Men's marathon T12 =

Men's marathon T12 at the XVI Paralympic Games
- Venue: Tokyo National Stadium
- Dates: 5 September 2021
- Competitors: 13 from 8 nations
- Winning time: 2:21:43

Medalists
1st place, gold medalist(s)		El Amin Chentouf	Morocco
2nd place, silver medalist(s)		Jaryd Clifford	Australia
3rd place, bronze medalist(s)		Tadashi Horikoshi	Japan

The men's marathon T12 event at the 2020 Summer Paralympics in Tokyo, took place on 5 September 2021.

The T12 category is for athletes with visual impairment. Athletes in this category will generally have some residual sight, the ability to recognise the shape of a hand at a distance of 2 metres and the ability to perceive clearly will be no more than 2/60. T12 athletes commonly run with guides.

== Records ==
Prior to the competition, the existing records were as follows:

World Record	Jaryd Clifford (AUS)	2:19:08	Sydney, Australia	25 April 2021
Paralympic Record	Alberto Suárez Laso (ESP)	2:24:50	London, United Kingdom	9 September 2012

Area	Time	Athlete	Nation
Africa	2:21:23	El Amin Chentouf	Morocco
America	2:26:39	Elkin Serna	Colombia
Asia	2:22:28	Tadashi Horikoshi	Japan
Europe	2:21:47	Alberto Suárez Laso	Spain
Oceania	2:19:08 WR	Jaryd Clifford	Australia

== Results ==
The race took place on 5 September 2021, at 6:50:

Rank	Name	Nationality	Class	Time	Notes
1st place, gold medalist(s)	El Amin Chentouf	Morocco	T12	2:21:43	GR
2nd place, silver medalist(s)	Jaryd Clifford	Australia	T12	2:26:09	
3rd place, bronze medalist(s)	Tadashi Horikoshi	Japan	T12	2:28:01	SB
4	Hatem Nasrallah	Tunisia	T12	2:29:55	
5	Alberto Suárez Laso	Spain	T12	2:30:44	SB
6	Wajdi Boukhili	Tunisia	T12	2:31:16	
7	Yutaka Kumagai	Japan	T12	2:31:32	SB
8	Gustavo Nieves	Spain	T12	2:32:08	SB
9	Shinya Wada	Japan	T11	2:33:05	GR (T11)
10	Denis Gavrilov; Sergey Ivanov (Guide)	RPC	T12	2:39:48	SB
11	Nacer-Eddine Karfas	Algeria	T12	2:41:02	SB
12	Hicham Hanyn	Morocco	T12	2:41:04	SB
	Yeltsin Jacques	Brazil	T11	DNF	
