= Wajdi Boukhili =

Tunisian Paralympic athlete (born 1998)

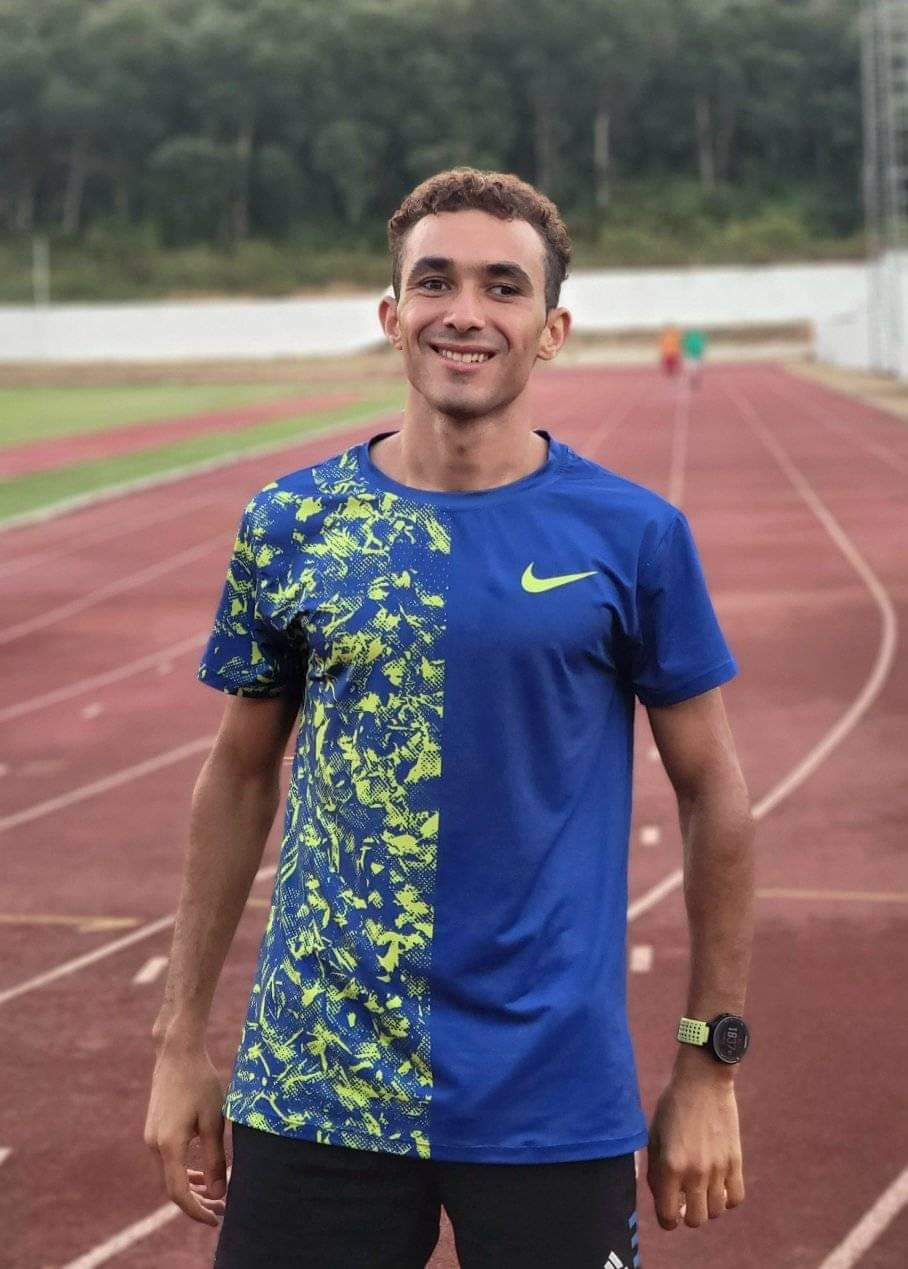
- Boukhili in 2022

Personal information
- Born: 20 September 1998 (age 28) Jendouba, Tunisia

Sport
- Country: Tunisia
- Sport: Paralympic athletics
- Disability class: T12
- Events: Marathon; 5000 metres
- Club: Jendouba Athletics Club
Medal record
Men's athletics
Representing Tunisia
Summer Paralympics
Gold medal – first place	2024 Paris	Marathon T12

Wajdi Boukhili (Arabic: وجدي البوكحيلي; born 20 September 1998) is a Tunisian Paralympic long-distance and marathon runner. who specializes in sprint events. He competed in the 2020 Summer Paralympics in Tokyo and finished sixth in the men's 5000 m and marathon races, both in the T12 category. He competed in the 2024 Summer Paralympics in Paris and won the marathon race in the T12 category.

== Early life and education ==
Boukhili was born and raised in Jendouba, Tunisia, where he started his career with the National Guard Sports Club in 2014. He then moved to Radès in 2019 and began training with the Tunisian national team, from where his professional career began.

== Career ==
Boukhili finished in 3rd place in the 2019 Wolfsburg Half Marathon in Germany. He won the final of the 2019 Tunisian Marathon Championship 42 km. He finished in 2nd place in the 2020 Grand Prix Meeting in Marrakech in the 5000 meter race. He won the 21 km 2020 Sfax International Half Marathon. He finished in 3rd place in the 42 km 2020 International Marathon in Wolfsburg, Germany.

Boukhili finished 2nd place in the 2021 Grand Prix Meeting in Tunisia in the 5000 meter race. He finished in 2nd place in the 42 km 2021 International Marathon in Tuscany, Italy. At the 2020 Summer Paralympics, he finished 6th in the 5000m T12 race and 6th place in the 2020 Summer Paralympics in Japan in the 42 km marathon race.

Boukhili finished in 2nd place in the 21 km 2022 International Half Marathon in Marsa, Tunisia. He finished in 2nd place in the 2022 Rades Grand Prix in Tunisia in the 5000 meter race. He won the 2022 Wolfsburg International Half Marathon in Germany. He finished in 5th place in the 42 km 2022 Komar International Marathon. He also won the 2022 Nabeul Half Marathon. At the 2024 Summer Paralympics, Boukhili won the men's marathon race.
