= Athletics at the 2024 Summer Paralympics – Women's marathon T54 =

Women's marathon T54 at the XVII Paralympic Games
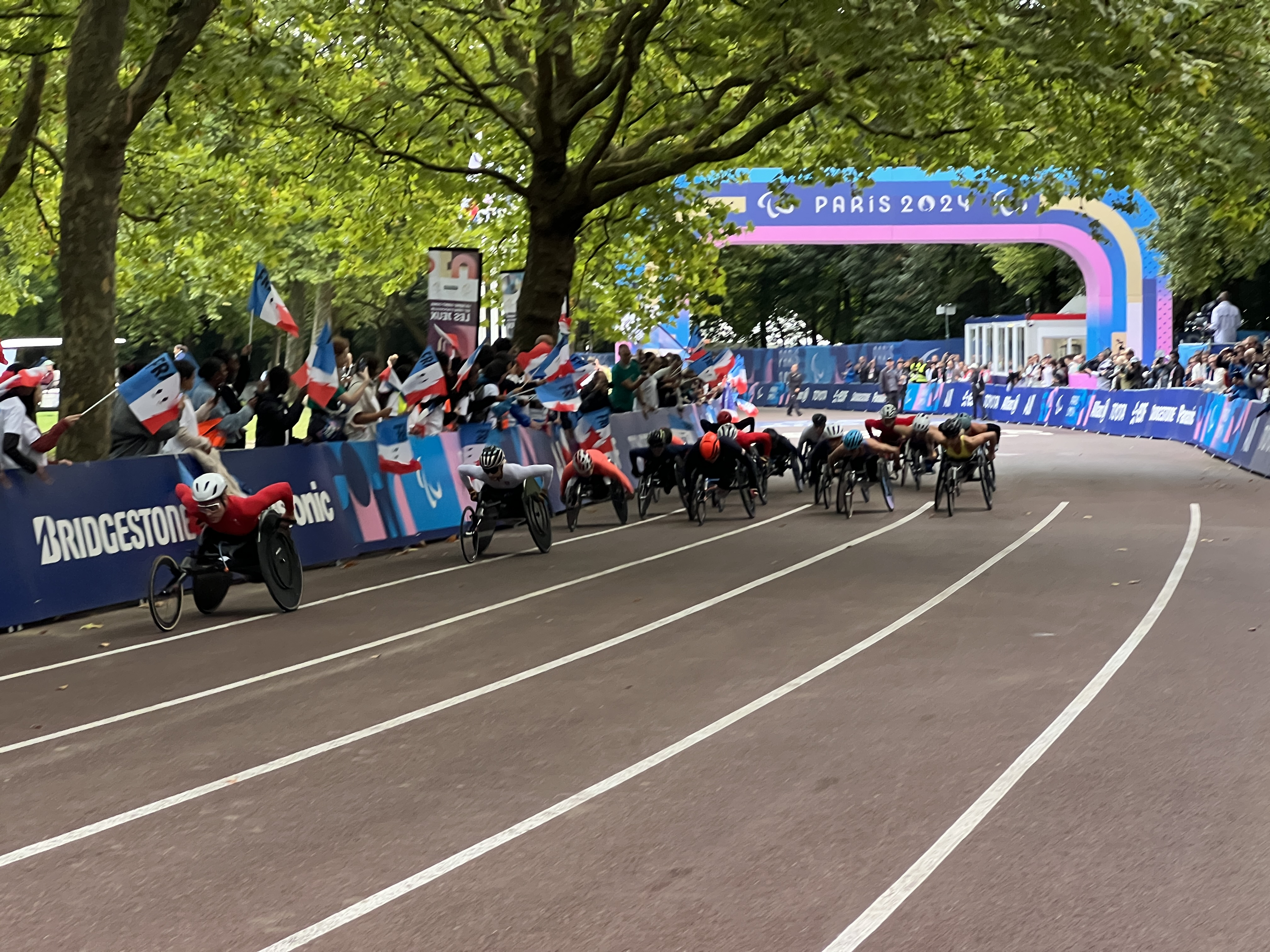
- Start of the race at Georges Valbon park.
- Venue: Les Invalides, Paris, France
- Dates: 8 September 2024
- Competitors: 16 from 9 nations
- Winning time: 1:41:50

Medalists
1st place, gold medalist(s)		Catherine Debrunner	Switzerland
2nd place, silver medalist(s)		Madison de Rozario	Australia
3rd place, bronze medalist(s)		Susannah Scaroni	United States

Marathon at the 2024 Summer Paralympics
Men's · T12 · T54 · Women's · T12 · T54

The Women's marathon T54 at the 2024 Summer Paralympics took place on 8 September at Les Invalides in Paris.

== Records ==
T53/54 Records

World record	Catherine Debrunner (SUI)	1:34:16	(Germany) Berlin	24 September 2023
Paralympic record	Madison de Rozario (AUS)	1:38:11	(Japan) Tokyo	5 September 2021

== Classification ==
The T53/54 classification is for wheelchair athletes with strong arm and torso movement, who have an impairment in their legs. Athletes have fast acceleration, can maintain top speed and maintain their pushing speed while steering.

== Results ==
The event took place on 8 September 2024.

Rank	Class	Athlete	Nation	Time	Notes
1st place, gold medalist(s)	T53	Catherine Debrunner	Switzerland	1:41:50	
2nd place, silver medalist(s)	T53	Madison de Rozario	Australia	1:46:13	
3rd place, bronze medalist(s)	T53	Susannah Scaroni	United States	1:46:29	
4	T54	Manuela Schaer	Switzerland	1:49:22	
5	T54	Zhou Zhaoqian	China	1:52:09	SB
6	T54	Wakako Tsuchida	Japan	1:52:39	
7	T53	Tatyana McFadden	United States	1:53:52	
8	T54	Aline Rocha	Brazil	1:53:54	
9	T54	Merle Menje	Germany	1:55:54	
10	T54	Vanessa Cristina de Souza	Brazil	1:56:33	
11	T54	Patricia Eachus	Switzerland	2:01:39	
12	T54	Tsubasa Kina	Japan	2:04:53	
13	T54	Jenna Fesemyer	United States	2:05:42	
14	T54	Noemi Alphonse	Mauritius	2:07:59	
15	T54	Tian Yajuan	China	2:12:51	SB
—	T54	Eden Rainbow-Cooper	Great Britain	DNF	
