= Misato Michishita =

Japanese Paralympic athlete (born 1977)

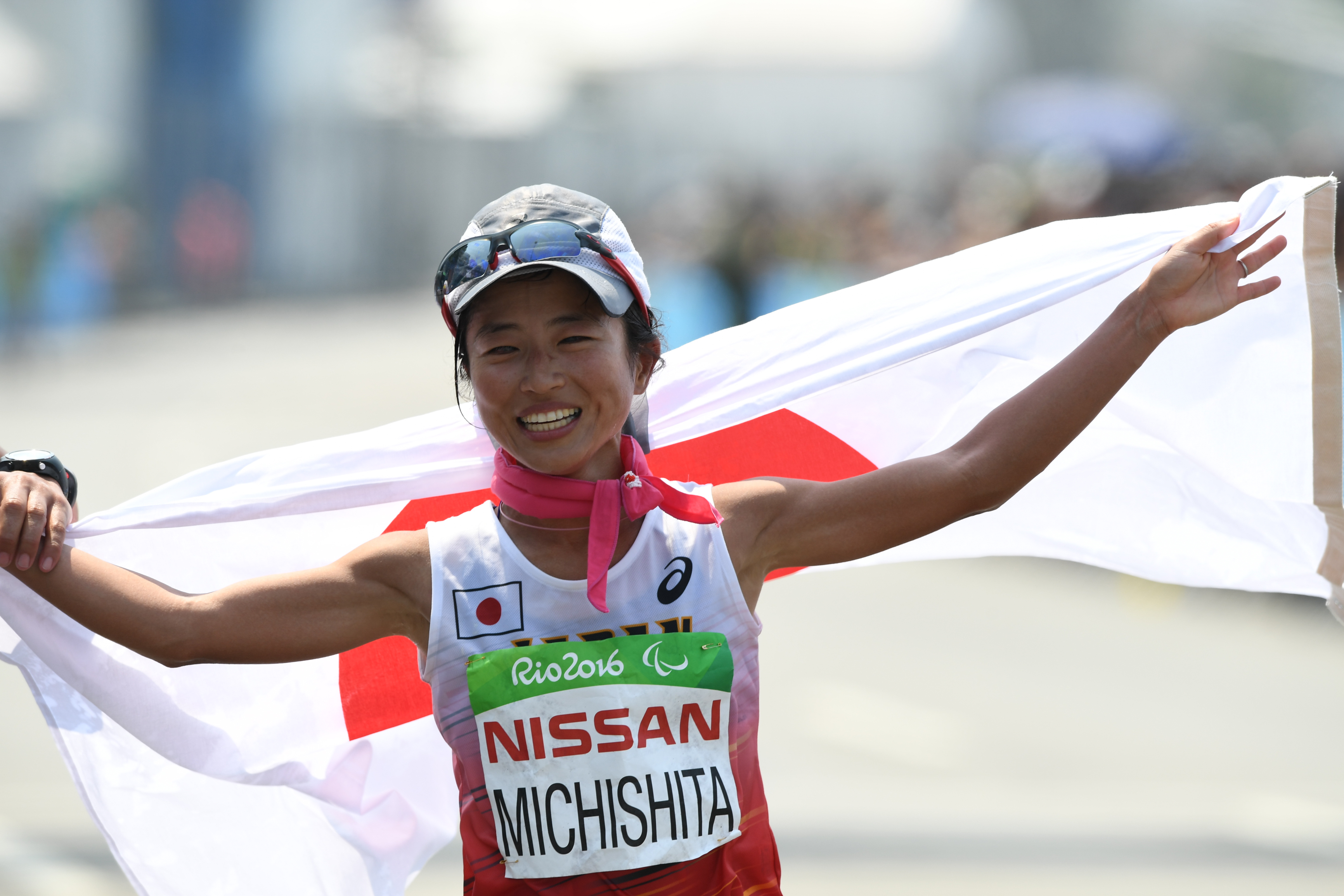
- Michishita at 2016 Summer Paralympics

Personal information
- Nationality: Japanese
- Born: 19 January 1977 (age 49) Shimonoseki, Japan
- Height: 1.44 m (4 ft 9 in)

Sport
- Country: Japan
- Sport: Paralympic athletics
- Disability: Visual impairment
- Disability class: T12
- Event: Marathon
Medal record
Women's para athletics
Representing Japan
Paralympic Games
Gold medal – first place	2020 Tokyo	Marathon T12
Silver medal – second place	2016 Rio de Janeiro	Marathon T12
Bronze medal – third place	2024 Paris	Marathon T12
World Championships
Gold medal – first place	2019 London	Marathon T12
Bronze medal – third place	2015 London	Marathon T11/12

Misato Michishita (道下 美里, Michishita Misato; born 19 January 1977 in Shimonoseki City) is a visually impaired Japanese Paralympic long-distance and marathon runner. She silver medalled at the 2016 Summer Paralympics in Rio de Janeiro, and won the gold medal at the 2020 Summer Paralympics in Tokyo. She won the bronze medal the 2024 Summer Paralympics with a time of 3:04:23 in Paris, after Elena Congost from Spain was controversially disqualified with a time of 3:00:48 despite a human reflex when her companion almost fell.
