= Francisco Sanclemente =

Colombian Paralympian

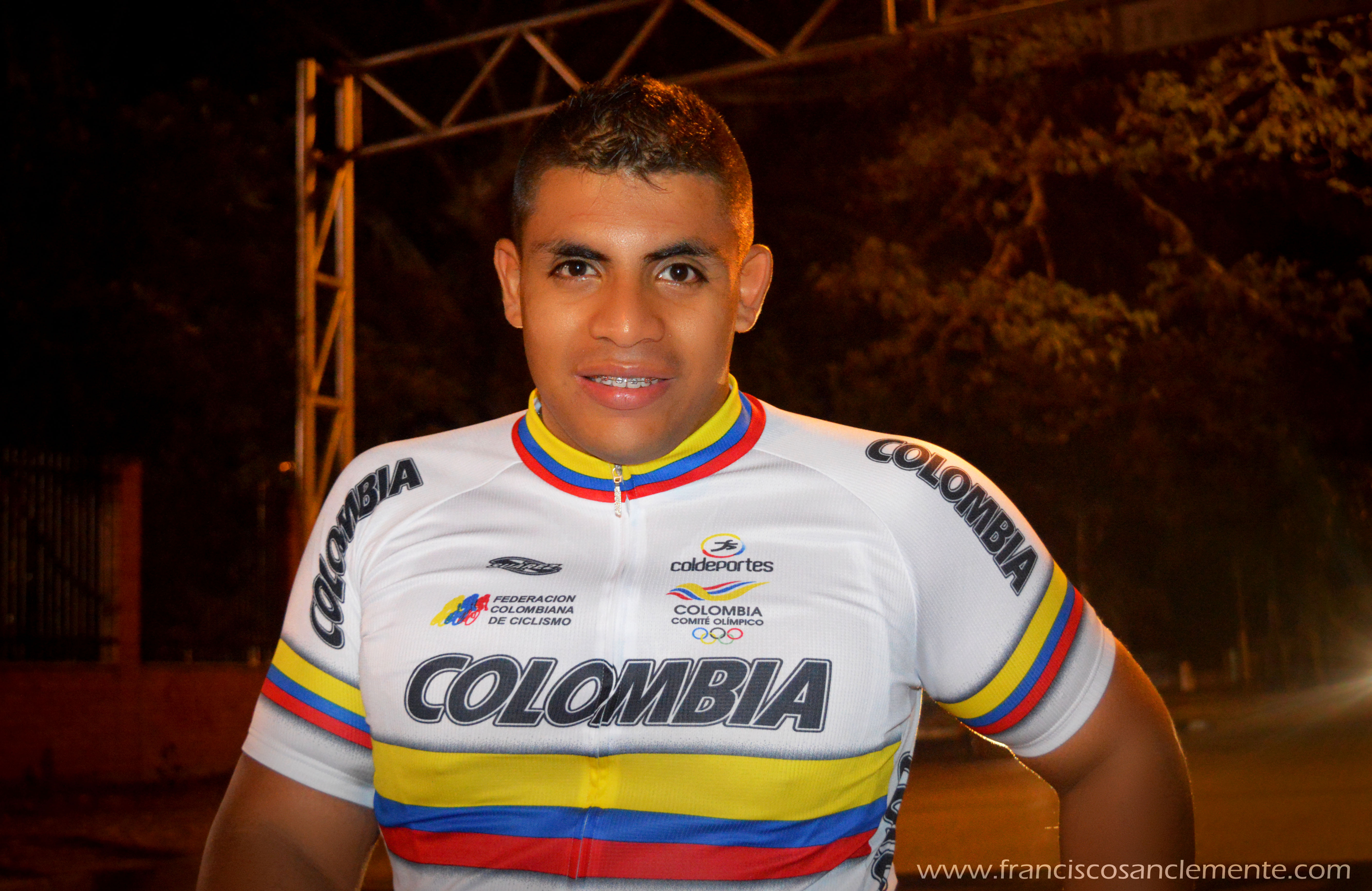

Personal information
- Born: 21 April 1988 (age 37) Buga, Valle del Cauca, Colombia

Sport
- Sport: Paralympic athletics

Francisco Sanclemente (born 21 April 1988) is a Colombian Paralympian who competes in wheelchair races. He finished 10th at the 2024 Paralympics marathon, and won the wheelchair marathon portions of the 2023, 2024 and 2025 Los Angeles Marathons.

Sanclemente was suspended by the International Paralympic Committee for 13 months from September 2019 to October 2020, having made an unintentional anti-doping rule violation.
