= Tadashi Horikoshi =

Japanese Paralympic athlete (born 1988)

Personal information
- Born: 19 July 1988 (age 38) Nagano, Japan

Sport
- Country: Japan
- Sport: Paralympic athletics
- Disability: Visual impairment
- Disability class: T12
- Event: Marathon
Medal record
Paralympic Games
Bronze medal – third place	2020 Tokyo	Marathon T12
Asian Para Games
Gold medal – first place	2014 Incheon	5000m T12
Gold medal – first place	2018 Jakarta	5000m T12
Bronze medal – third place	2018 Jakarta	1500m T12/13

Tadashi Horikoshi (堀越 信司, Horikoshi Tadashi, born 19 July 1988) is a Japanese Paralympic long-distance and marathon runner. He won the bronze medal in the men's marathon T12 event at the 2020 Summer Paralympics held in Tokyo, Japan. He also competed at the Summer Paralympics in 2008, 2012 and 2016.

He won bronze medals at both the 2017 and 2019 World Para Athletics Marathon Championships in London. Domestically, he represents the NTT West Japan track and field team.
