= Martin Clobert =

Belgian Paralympic athlete (born 1993)

Personal information
- Born: 22 February 1993 (age 32)
- Home town: Namur, Belgium

Sport
- Country: Belgium
- Sport: Paralympic athletics
- Disability class: T12
- Event: marathon
- Club: SMAC – LEG’S GO
- Coached by: Pascale Henkinbrant

Martin Clobert (born 22 February 1993) is a Belgian Paralympic athlete who competes in the marathon.

== Biography ==
Clobert suffers from Leber's hereditary optic neuropathy. A keen basketballer at young age, he was forced to quit the sport due to his worsening illness. He played Blind football for a while, then minifootbal, amateur basketball again, before switching to the marathon. After finishing a marathon in 2h48, he was picked up by the Ligue handisport francophone and supported by it since 2021.

Clobert studied physiotherapie at the Haute École Léonard de Vinci – Parnasse-ISEI in Brussels. He works as a physiotherapist.

== Career ==
Clobert was selected for the 2024 Summer Paralympic Games after running 2h33.46s at the Marathon of Valencia. In Paris, he finished in 11th place in a time of 2:38:34s.
