= Elena Congost =

Spanish Paralympic athlete (born 1987)

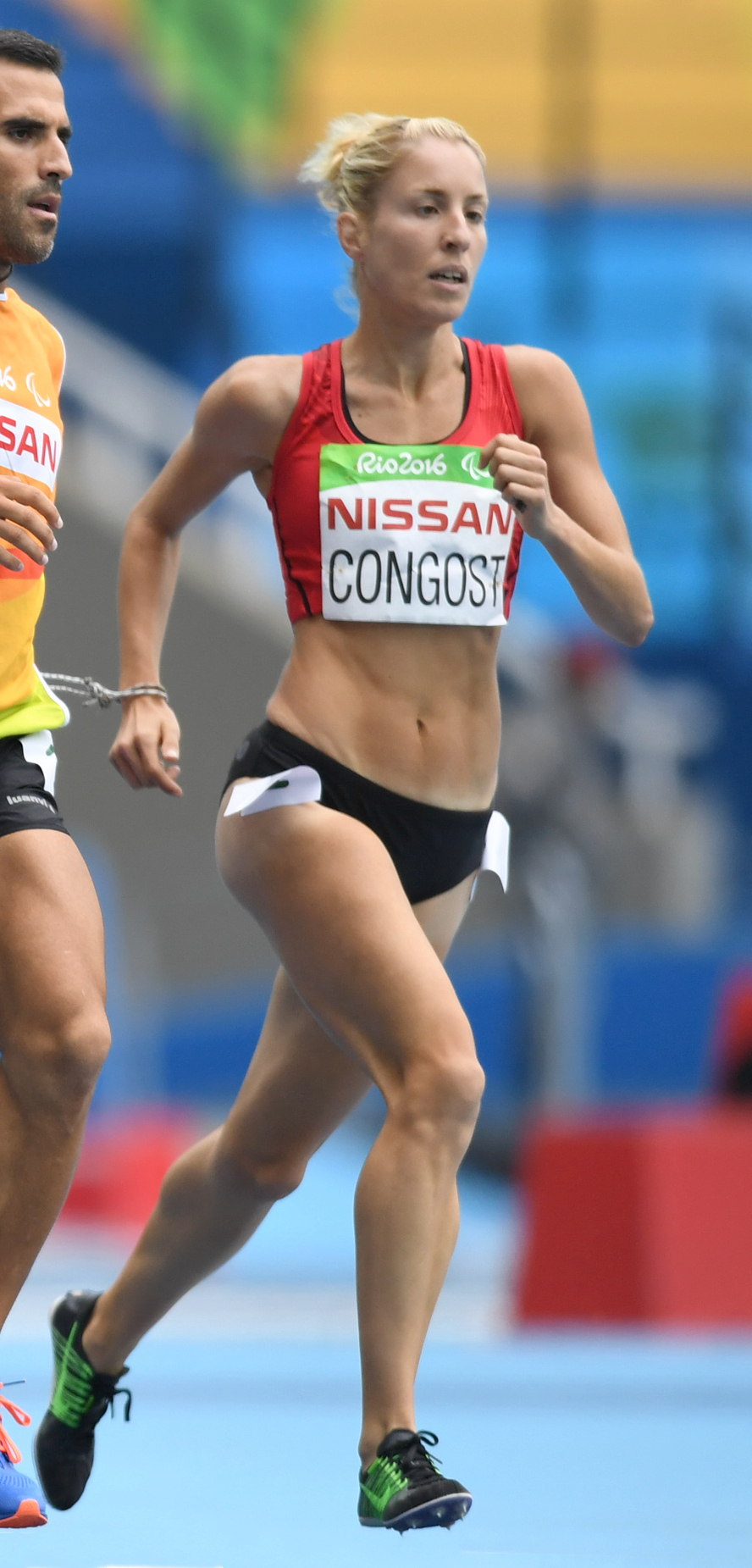
- Congost running 1500 m with a guide at the 2016 Paralympics

Personal information
- Full name: Elena Congost Mohedano
- Nationality: Spanish
- Born: 20 September 1987 (age 39) Madrid, Spain

Sport
- Country: Spain
- Sport: Paralympic athletics
- Disability class: T12
Medal record
Representing Spain
Paralympic Games
Gold medal – first place	2016 Rio de Janeiro	Marathon T12
Silver medal – second place	2012 London	1500 m T12
IPC Athletics World Championships
Silver medal – second place	2011 Christchurch	1500 m T12

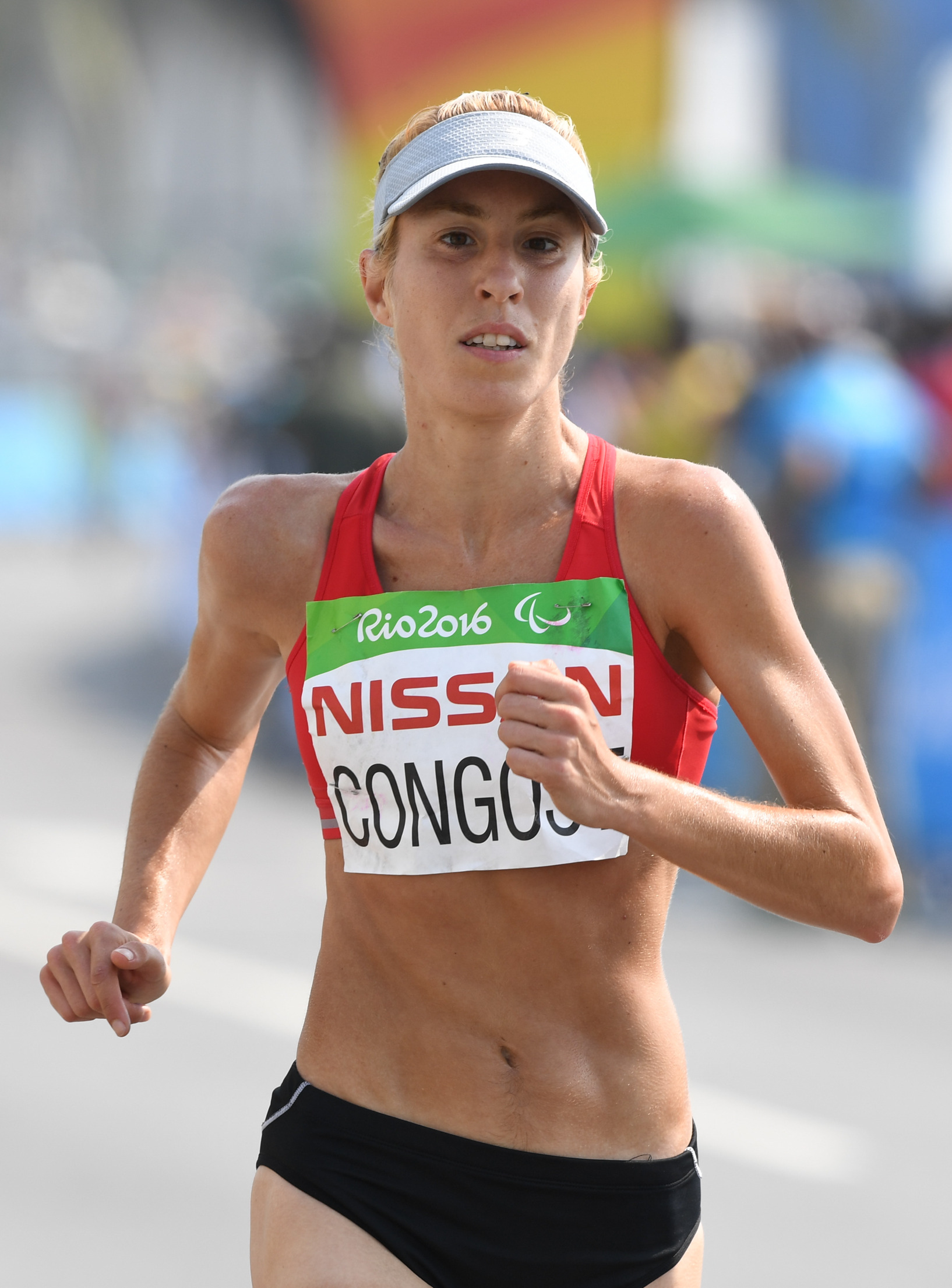
Congost running the marathon at the 2016 Paralympics

Elena Congost Mohedano (Note: In this Spanish name, the first or paternal surname is Congost and the second or maternal family name is Mohedano.) (born in Madrid 20 September 1987) is a T12/B2 track and field athlete from Spain. Born with a degenerative vision impairment, she is a teacher who lives in Barcelona, Spain. She has competed at the 2004, 2008, 2012, 2016 and 2024 Summer Paralympics and won the marathon in 2016, placing second in the 1500 m in 2012.

== Personal ==
Congost was born 20 September 1987 in Madrid, with a degenerative hereditary eye disease. Her vision started to deteriorate when she was in school. She is a teacher.

In 2008, she moved to Castelldefels, Barcelona, and was still living in the region in 2012. At the 2011 Castelldefels sports awards, she won the award for best female athlete with a disability. Living at the High Performance Centre (CAR) of San Cugat del Vallés in 2013, she shared a room with Mireia Belmonte. In 2013, she was awarded the silver Real Orden al Mérito Deportivo.

As of 2016, Congost has been a vegan for seven years for ethical, environmental and health reasons. She credits it for a significant improvement in her anemia, digestive problems and other ailments.

== Athletics ==
Congost is T12/B2 type athlete. She is a member of ISS L'Hospitalet Atletisme, an athletic club in L'Hospitalet. At the 2002 IPC World Championship in France, Congost finished seventh in the F12 long jump. She had a pair of fifth-place finishes at the 2003 EPC European Athletics Championships in the 100 meter and long jump events. At the 2003 IBSA World Games Athletics in Quebec, she earned a silver medal in the 4×400 relay and a 5th place in the long jump.

Congost competed at the 2004 Summer Paralympics and finished seventh in the 200 m race. At the 2006 World Athletics Championships, she placed fifth over 800 m. At the 2007 2n Míting Internacional per Atletes Discapacitats, she won a bronze medal in the 600 m event.

In 2008, Congost was affiliated with the Catalan region for national competitions. With a time of 2:24.53, she finished seventh at the Manresa hosted 2008 CT. España Clubes Primera División 2ª J. Titulo Mujeres MAN-TFE-TFE-DIP race. With a time of 2:27.28, she finished fifth at the Burgos hosted 2008 CT. España Clubes Primera División 1ª Jornada Mujeres ANT-MED-MAN-UOV race. With a time of 2:27.75, she finished fifth at the Collado Villalba hosted 2008 CT. España Clubes Primera Division 3ª J. Titulo Mujeres MAP-MAN-TFE-UOV race. She competed at the 2008 Summer Paralympics, where she finished sixth in the 1500 meter race. She also raced in the 800 meter race and finished 6 in the semifinal.

Congost competed at the 2011 IPC World Athletics Championships and earned a silver medal in the T12 1500 meter race. At the 2011 IBSA World Games Athletics in São Paulo, she finished third in the 800 meter T12 event. In 2012, she was a recipient of a Plan ADO €20,000 scholarship with a €3,000 reserve. Prior to the start of the London Games, she trained with several other visually impaired Spanish track and field athletes in Logroño.

As a twenty-four-year-old, Congost at the 2012 Summer Paralympics, earning a silver medal in the 1500 meter race. Her silver medal was the first silver given out to a female track and field athlete at the London Games. In May 2013, she competed in the Spanish national championships, where she earned a gold medal in the 1500 meters. In July 2013, she participated in the 2013 IPC Athletics World Championships.

She initially finished third in the Marathon T12 at the 2024 Paralympics. But was disqualified after she crossed the line, due to momentarily releasing the tether connected to her guide in the final meters of the race, in order to assist her guide who was struggling to make the finish line.
