= Athletics at the 2016 Summer Paralympics – Women's 100 metres =

The Women's 100m athletics events for the 2016 Summer Paralympics take place at the Estádio Olímpico João Havelange from September 8 to September 17, 2016. A total of 15 events were contested over this distance for 19 different classifications.

== Schedule ==
R	Round 1	½	Semifinals	F	Final

Event↓/Date →	Thu 8	Fri 9	Sat 10	Sun 11	Mon 12	Tue 13	Wed 14	Thu 15	Fri 16	Sat 17
T11 100m	R	F								
T12 100m	R	F								
T13 100m			R	F						
T34 100m			F							
T35 100m							F			
T36 100m	R	F								
T37 100m	R	F								
T38 100m	R	F								
T42 100m										F
T44 100m										F
T47 100m			R	F						
T52 100m										F
T53 100m	F									
T54 100m	R	F								

== Medal summary ==
Classification	Gold		Silver		Bronze	
T11	Libby Clegg guide : Chris Clarke; Great Britain	11.96	Zhou Guohua guide : Jia Dengpu; China	11.98	Liu Cuiqing guide : Xu Donglin; China	12.07
T12	Omara Durand guide : Yuniol Kindelan; Cuba	11.40 WR	Elena Chebanu guide : Hakim Ibrahimov; Azerbaijan	11.71 AR	Katrin Mueller-Rottgardt guide : Sebastian Fricke; Germany	11.99
T13	Leilia Adzhametova; Ukraine	11.79 WR	Ilse Hayes; South Africa	11.91	Kym Crosby; United States	12.24
T34 (inc T33)	Hannah Cockroft; Great Britain	17.42 PR	Kare Adenegan; Great Britain	18.29	Alexa Halko; United States	18.81
T35	Zhou Xia; China	13.66 PR RR	Isis Holt; Australia	13.75	Maria Lyle; Great Britain	14.41
T36	Yanina Martinez; Argentina	14.46	Claudia Nicoleitzik; Germany	14.64	Martha Liliana Hernández Florián; Colombia	14.71
T37	Georgina Hermitage; Great Britain	13.13 WR	Mandy Francois-Elie; France	13.45	Yescarly Medina; Venezuela	13.85
T38	Sophie Hahn; Great Britain	12.62 PR	Verônica Hipólito; Brazil	12.88	Kadeena Cox; Great Britain	13.02
T42 (inc. T41)	Martina Caironi; Italy	14.97	Vanessa Low; Germany	15.17 PB	Monica Graziana Contrafatto; Italy	16.30
T44 (inc. T43)	Marlou van Rhijn; Netherlands	13.02	Irmgard Bensusan; Germany	13.04	Nyoshia Cain; Trinidad and Tobago	13.10
T47 (inc T45, T46)	Deja Young; United States	12.15	Alicja Fiodorow; Poland	12.46	Teresinha Correia; Brazil	12.84
T52 (inc. T51)	Michelle Stilwell; Canada	19.42	Kerry Morgan; United States	19.96	Marieke Vervoort; Belgium	20.12
T53	Huang Lisha; China	16.28	Zhou Hongzhuan; China	16.51	Angela Ballard; Australia	16.59
T54	Liu Wenjun; China	16.00	Tatyana McFadden; United States	16.13	Li Yingjie; China	16.22

== Results ==
The following were the results of the finals of each of the women's 100 metres events in each of the classifications. Further details of each event are available on that event's dedicated page.

=== T11 ===
Rank	Athlete	Country	Time	Notes
1st place, gold medalist(s)	Libby Clegg; Guide: Chris Clarke	Great Britain	11.96	
2nd place, silver medalist(s)	Zhou Guohua; Guide: Jia Dengpu	China	11.98	
3rd place, bronze medalist(s)	Liu Cuiqing; Guide: Xu Donglin	China	12.07	
4	Terezinha Guilhermina; Guide: Rafael Lazarini	Brazil	DQ	

=== T12 ===
Rank	Athlete	Country	Time	Notes
1st place, gold medalist(s)	Omara Durand; Yuniol Kindelan : guide	Cuba	11.40 WR	
2nd place, silver medalist(s)	Elena Chebanu; Hakim Ibrahimov : guide	Azerbaijan	11.71	AR
3rd place, bronze medalist(s)	Katrin Mueller-Rottgardt; Sebastian Fricke : guide	Germany	11.99	
4	Alice de Oliveira Correa; Diogo Cardaso da Silva : guide	Brazil	12.26	
			Wind: −0.1 m/s	

=== T13 ===
Rank	Athlete	Country	Time	Notes
1st place, gold medalist(s)	Leilia Adzhametova	Ukraine	11.79	WR
2nd place, silver medalist(s)	Ilse Hayes	South Africa	11.91	SB
3rd place, bronze medalist(s)	Kym Crosby	United States	12.24	PB
4	Olena Gliebova	Ukraine	12.28	PB
5	Nantenin Keïta	France	12.36	
6	Carolina Duarte	Portugal	12.48	PB
7	Sanaa Benhama	Morocco	12.49	
8	Orla Comerford	Ireland	12.87	

=== T34 ===
The Women's T34 race was also open to T33 athletes. There were no heats, and all eight athletes competed in the final.

Rank	Athlete	Country	Time	Notes
1st place, gold medalist(s)	Hannah Cockroft	Great Britain	17.42	PR
2nd place, silver medalist(s)	Kare Adenegan	Great Britain	18.29	
3rd place, bronze medalist(s)	Alexa Halko	United States	18.81	
4	Amy Siemons	Netherlands	18.82	
5	Rosemary Little	Australia	19.05	
6	Carly Tait	Great Britain	19.73	
7	Haruka Kitaura	Japan	20.23	
8	Joyce Lefevre	Belgium	21.02	

=== T35 ===
As only seven athletes entered the T35 event, no heats were held and all athletes automatically qualified for the final.

Rank	Lane	Athlete	Country	Time	Notes
1st place, gold medalist(s)	7	Zhou Xia	China	13.66	PR, AS
2nd place, silver medalist(s)	2	Isis Holt	Australia	13.75	
3rd place, bronze medalist(s)	3	Maria Lyle	Great Britain	14.41	
4	6	Brianna Coop	Australia	15.56	
5	5	Oxana Corso	Italy	15.67	
6	4	Uta Streckert	Germany	17.66	
	8	Anna Luxova	Czech Republic	DNS	

Wind: −0.6 m/s

=== T36 ===
10:43 9 September 2016:

Rank	Lane	Bib	Name	Nationality	Reaction	Time	Notes
1st place, gold medalist(s)	5	22	Yanina Andrea Martinez	Argentina		14.46	
2nd place, silver medalist(s)	6	372	Claudia Nicoleitzik	Germany		14.64	
3rd place, bronze medalist(s)	4	214	Martha Liliana Hernandez Florian	Colombia		14.71	
4	9	493	Min Jae Jeon	South Korea		14.88	
5	8	219	Daniela Rodriguez Angulo	Colombia		15.23	
6	7	109	Tascitha Oliveira Cruz	Brazil		15.28	
7	2	551	Sandra Fonseca Solis	Mexico		16.14	
8	3	399	Kwok Fan Yam	Hong Kong		16.48	

=== T37 ===
17:36 9 September 2016:

Rank	Lane	Bib	Name	Nationality	Reaction	Time	Notes
1st place, gold medalist(s)	6	332	Georgina Hermitage	Great Britain		13.13	
2nd place, silver medalist(s)	4	305	Mandy Francois-Elie	France		13.45	
3rd place, bronze medalist(s)	7	935	Yescarly Medina	Venezuela		13.85	
4	5	828	Neda Bahi	Tunisia		13.88	
5	2	168	Yingli Li	China		14.05	
6	8	375	Maria Seifert	Germany		14.13	
7	9	598	Johanna Benson	Namibia		14.16	
8	3	735	Liezel Gouws	South Africa		14.84	

=== T38 ===
The T38 event was for athletes with cerebral palsy the least amount of impediment.

Rank	Athlete	Country	Time	Notes
1st place, gold medalist(s)	Sophie Hahn	Great Britain	12.62 =PR	
2nd place, silver medalist(s)	Verônica Hipólito	Brazil	12.88	
3rd place, bronze medalist(s)	Kadeena Cox	Great Britain	13.01	
4	Chen Junfei	China	13.06	
5	Lindy Ave	Germany	13.20	
6	Ella Azura Pardy	Australia	13.22	
7	Olivia Breen	Great Britain	13.41	
8	Jennifer Santos	Brazil	13.61	
			Wind:	

=== T42 ===
19:52 17 September 2016:

Rank	Lane	Bib	Name	Nationality	Reaction	Time	Notes
1st place, gold medalist(s)	5	447	Martina Caironi	Italy		14.97	
2nd place, silver medalist(s)	6	369	Vanessa Low	Germany		15.17	
3rd place, bronze medalist(s)	7	448	Monica Graziana Contrafatto	Italy		16.30	
4	9	118	Ana Cláudia Silva	Brazil		16.43	
5	4	891	Scout Bassett	United States		16.66	
6	8	374	Jana Schmidt	Germany		16.84	
7	3	468	Kaede Maegawa	Japan		17.39	
8	2	474	Hitomi Onishi	Japan		17.51	

=== T44 ===
20:34 17 September 2016:

Rank	Lane	Bib	Name	Nationality	Reaction	Time	Notes
1st place, gold medalist(s)	6	618	Marlou van Rhijn	Netherlands		13.02	
2nd place, silver medalist(s)	4	359	Irmgard Bensusan	Germany		13.04	
3rd place, bronze medalist(s)	9	818	Nyoshia Cain	Trinidad and Tobago		13.10	
4	5	336	Sophie Kamlish	Great Britain		13.16	
5	3	345	Laura Sugar	Great Britain		13.37	
6	7	308	Marie-Amelie le Fur	France		13.40	
7	8	616	Marlene van Gansewinkel	Netherlands		13.64	
8	2	476	Saki Takakuwa	Japan		13.65	

=== T47 ===
Rank	Lane	Athlete	Country	Time	Notes
1st place, gold medalist(s)	7	Deja Young	United States	12.15	
2nd place, silver medalist(s)	6	Alicja Fiodorow	Poland	12.46	
3rd place, bronze medalist(s)	9	Teresinha de Jesus Correia dos Santos	Brazil	12.84	
4	2	Anna Grimaldi	New Zealand	12.96	
5	4	Polly Maton	Great Britain	13.09	
6	8	Sheila Finder	Brazil	13.27	
7	3	Sae Tsuji	Japan	13.30	
8	5	Yunidis Castillo	Cuba	1:06.16	

Wind: +0.2 m/s

=== T52 ===
11:05 17 September 2016:

Rank	Lane	Bib	Name	Nationality	Reaction	Time	Notes
1st place, gold medalist(s)	4	146	Michelle Stilwell	Canada		19.42	
2nd place, silver medalist(s)	5	909	Kerry Morgan	United States		19.96	
3rd place, bronze medalist(s)	7	71	Marieke Vervoort	Belgium		20.12	
4	6	466	Yuka Kiyama	Japan		24.44	
5	8	758	Norsilawati Binte Sa'at	Singapore		29.03	
	3	908	Cassie Mitchell	United States			DSQ

=== T53 ===
18:54 8 September 2016:

Rank	Lane	Bib	Name	Nationality	Reaction	Time	Notes
1st place, gold medalist(s)	3	162	Lisha Huang	China		16.28	
2nd place, silver medalist(s)	6	188	Hongzhuan Zhou	China		16.51	
3rd place, bronze medalist(s)	4	30	Angela Ballard	Australia		16.59	
4	8	849	Hamide Kurt	Turkey		17.01	
5	5	337	Samantha Kinghorn	Great Britain		17.13	
6	1	77	Jessica Cooper Lewis	Bermuda		17.25	
7	7	901	Kelsey Lefevour	United States		17.31	
8	2	140	Ilana Dupont	Canada		17.82	

=== T54 ===
19:14 9 September 2016:

Rank	Lane	Bib	Name	Nationality	Reaction	Time	Notes
1st place, gold medalist(s)	4	170	Wenjun Liu	China		16.00	
2nd place, silver medalist(s)	5	906	Tatyana McFadden	United States		16.13	
3rd place, bronze medalist(s)	6	167	Yingjie Li	China		16.22	
4	8	905	Hannah McFadden	United States		16.34	
5	3	903	Cheri Madsen	United States		16.40	
6	7	297	Amanda Kotaja	Finland		16.47	
7	1	625	Hannah Babalola	Nigeria		16.85	
8	2	615	Margriet van den Broek	Netherlands		17.42	
