= 2018 World Para Athletics European Championships – Men's 400 metres =

The men's 400 metres at the 2018 World Para Athletics European Championships was held at the Friedrich-Ludwig-Jahn Sportpark in Berlin from 20 to 26 August.

== Medalists ==
Event	Gold		Silver		Bronze	
T11	Gerard Descarrega Puigdevall (ESP) guide : Guillermo Rojo Gil	50.65 CR	Mehmet Tunç (TUR) guide : Mehmet Tetik	55.59	no medal awarded	
T12	Oguz Akbulut (TUR)	49.92 CR	Luis Goncalves (POR)	50.33	Hakan Cıra (TUR)	50.40
T13	Jakub Nicpon (POL)	52.32	Diego Sancho Villeneuva (ESP)	53.32	Serhii Bereziuk (UKR)	53.90
T20	Sandro Correia Baessa (POR)	49.60	Raffaele di Maggio (ITA)	50.86	Carlos Carvalho Freitas (POR)	52.16
T34	Henry Manni (FIN)	54.40 CR	Ben Rowlings (GBR)	55.92	Bojan Mitic (SUI)	56.31
T36	Krzysztof Ciuksza (POL)	55.90	Gert-Jan Schep (NED)	58.81	José Manuel González (ESP)	1:03.17
T37	Michał Kotkowski (POL)	53.31	Yaroslav Okapinskyi (UKR)	54.82	Renaud Clerc (FRA)	56.32
T38	Lorenzo Albaladejo Martinez (ESP)	55.71	Ross Paterson (GBR)	56.82	no medal awarded	
T47	Gunther Matzinger (AUT)	50.34	Antonis Aresti (CYP)	50.98	Ivan Cvetkovic (SRB)	51.49
T52	Kestutis Skucas (LTU)	1:08.39	Mario Trindade (POR)	1:08.45	Beat Boesch (SUI)	1:09.54
T53	Pierre Fairbank (FRA)	50.47	Nicolas Brignone (FRA)	51.91	Moatez Jomni (GBR)	53.03
T54	Leo Pekka Tahti (FIN)	46.73	Kenny van Weeghel (NED)	49.20	Dillon Labrooy (GBR)	51.15
T62	Johannes Floors (GER)	47.93	Olivier Hendriks (NED)	55.26	Stylianos Malakopoulos (GRE)	57.52
WR world record | AR area record | CR championship record | GR games record | NR national record | OR Olympic record | PB personal best | SB season best | WL world leading (in a given season)

== See also ==
- List of IPC world records in athletics
