= Stephen Morris (runner) =

Welsh paralympic athlete

Steve Morris
Personal information
- Born: Stephen Morris; 13 September 1988 (age 37) Cardiff, Wales

Sport
- Country: Great Britain
- Sport: Track and field
- Disability class: T20
- Event(s): 800m, 1500m
- Club: Cardiff Athletics Club
- Team: Great Britain
- Coached by: Paula Dunn (national); James Thie (personal)

Achievements and titles
- Paralympic finals: 2012 London
- World finals: 2013 Lyon

Stephen "Steve" Morris (born 13 September 1988) is a paralympic athlete from Cardiff, Wales. He competes in middle distance events in the T20 classification and represented Great Britain at the 2012 Summer Paralympics in London.

== Personal history ==
Stephen Morris was born in Cardiff in 1988. He was diagnosed with dyspraxia at the age of three. He attended Whitchurch High School in Cardiff, in the same year group as Wales and British Lions captain Sam Warburton and Wales footballer Gareth Bale.

== Athletic career ==
Morris first became involved in athletics while at school and began competing in 2006. Due to the events caused by the Spanish basketball team at the Sydney Paralympics, Morris' classification was removed from the Summer Games itinerary. T20 athletes were reintroduced for the 2012 Summer Paralympics in London, and Morris was selected to represent Great Britain in the 1,500-metre race. There were no heats for the race and the final was held on 4 September in a field of 11 athletes. Morris finished sixth with a time of 4:02.50. His personal best of 3:58.93, that he set two months earlier at the BMC Grand Prix in Stretford, would have been good enough for the silver medal position.

In 2013 Morris was again chosen to represent Great Britain, this time at the IPC World Championships in Lyon in the 1,500m (T20), finishing in eighth place. Although Morris did not attend 2014 European Championships, he was selected for the 2016 IPC Athletics European Championships in Grosseto. He competed in both the 800 metres and 1,500m finishing fourth and fifth respectively. In the build up to the 2016 Summer Paralympics in Rio, Morris recorded personal bests in the 800m (1:56.06) (British Record) and 1,500m (3:56.24) (European Record) both set in July. In late July Morris was confirmed as a member of the Great Britain team to compete at the Rio Paralympics.
