= Maria Lyle =

Scottish Paralympic athlete

Personal information
- Full name: Maria Lyle
- Nationality: Great Britain
- Born: 14 February 2000 (age 26) Dunbar, Scotland

Sport
- Country: Great Britain
- Sport: Athletics
- Event: T35 sprint
- Club: Team East Lothian
- Coached by: Jamie Bowie

Achievements and titles
- Highest world ranking: 1st - 100m (T35)
- Personal best(s): 100m sprint: 13.90s 200m sprint: 29.24s
Medal record
Women's Paralympic athletics
Representing Great Britain
Paralympic Games
Silver medal – second place	2016 Rio	4 × 100m relay – T35-38
Bronze medal – third place	2016 Rio	100m – T35
Bronze medal – third place	2016 Rio	200m – T35
Bronze medal – third place	2020 Tokyo	100 m – T35
World Championships
Gold medal – first place	2015 Doha	4 × 100m relay – T35-38
Silver medal – second place	2015 Doha	100m – T35
Silver medal – second place	2015 Doha	200m – T35
Bronze medal – third place	2017 London	100m – T35
Bronze medal – third place	2017 London	200m – T35
Bronze medal – third place	2023 Paris	100m – T35
Bronze medal – third place	2023 Paris	200m – T35
European Championships
Gold medal – first place	2014 Swansea	100m – T35
Gold medal – first place	2014 Swansea	200m – T35
Gold medal – first place	2016 Grosseto	100m – T35
Gold medal – first place	2016 Grosseto	200m – T35
Gold medal – first place	2016 Grosseto	4 × 100m relay – T35-38
Gold medal – first place	2018 Berlin	100m – T35
Representing Scotland
Commonwealth Games
Silver medal – second place	2018 Gold Coast	100m – T35

Maria Lyle (born 14 February 2000) is a retired para-athlete from Scotland who competed mainly in T35 sprint events. At the age of 14 she set a world record in the 200m sprint, a record she has broken on several occasions. In 2014, she qualified for the IPC Athletics European Championships in Swansea and won gold in both the 100m and 200m T35.

== Personal history ==
Lyle was born in Dunbar, Scotland, in 2000 to Raymond and Susan Lyle. She has one younger sister. She has spastic dipelgic cerebral palsy, attributed to her mother contracting shingles while pregnant with her.

Lyle is a former pupil of Dunbar Grammar School, having also attended Oaklands College in Hertfordshire, graduating from the elite Oaklands Wolves Sports Academy in 2017. She is studying for a degree in sports coaching at Edinburgh Napier University on a dual career athlete programme under the UK government's Talented Athletes Scholarship Scheme.

Lyle and journalist Gary Heatly co-host This Ability Podcast (GH Media).

== Running career ==
Lyle began running at the age of nine. In 2009, she joined Dunbar Running Club and began competing at local and national meets mainly in sprint events. In July 2012, at the age of 12, she posted a world record time of 32.37 in the 200m at the Birmingham Games. Despite the fact that this was faster than the winning time of 32.72 set by China's Liu Ping in the 2012 Paralympic 200m T35 final, Lyle was ineligible for the Games as she was too young to be given a disability classification which also meant that her record time could not be officially accepted.

In 2014, she was classified as a T35 athlete and in February she travelled to Dubai to compete at the Fazaa International, an IPC Grand Prix event. There she entered both the 100m and 200m sprints. She won gold in the 100m with a time of 14.58, though this was classed as wind assisted so she could not claim it as a personal best. In the 200m she ran 31.01, winning gold and beating Liu Ping's 2005 record of 32.27. Later that year in May she competed at the Bedford International Open and set a world record in the 100m of 14.63, and surpassed her own world record in the 200m with a time of 30.71.

Lyle was selected for her first major international when she represented Great Britain at the 2014 IPC Athletics European Championships in Swansea. In her first event, the 100m T35, she won gold with a time of 14.92, beating Italy's Oxana Corso by over a second and a half. The next day she took part in the 200m, and in poor weather conditions ran 31.05 to take her second European title.

In the build up to the 2015 IPC Athletics World Championships in Doha, Lyle took part in the Newham International where she ran 13.90 in the 100m and 29.24 in the 200m sprint, though the times were unofficial and did not count as world records. In Doha, Lyle's first event saw her line up against the new world record holder Isis Holt. Holt, a 14 year old from Australia, pushed Lyle into second place with a world record sprint, though Lyle's time of 29.32 was an official personal best and new European record.

At the 2016 IPC Athletics European Championships in Grosseto Lyle won three golds, in the T35 100m 200m - where she set a new championship record of 29.91s - and the T35-T38 4 × 100 m relay, alongside Olivia Breen, Georgina Hermitage and Sophie Hahn. At the 2016 Summer Paralympics, Lyle took individual bronze medals in the T35 100m and the 200m, and a silver as part of Team GB's T35-T38 4 × 100 m relay squad. At the 2017 World Para Athletics Championships in London, she took two more medals, a bronze in the T35 100m and a silver in the 200m.

At the 2018 Commonwealth Games on the Gold Coast, Lyle took a silver in the T35 100m. However, after the Games, her mental health worsened, which she later admitted had led to her considering quitting the sport. She was diagnosed with anxiety, which she overcame with the support of a specialist sports counsellor. At the 2018 World Para Athletics European Championships in Berlin, Lyle successfully defended her T35 100m title.

In June 2021 she was among the first dozen athletes chosen for the UK athletics teams at the postponed 2020 Paralympics in Tokyo. At the Games she took another Paralympic bronze in the T35 100m. She is coached by Jamie Bowie.

Lyle announced her retirement on 4 July 2024.

== Other awards ==
Lyle was awarded British Athletics Young Paralympic Athlete of the Year in 2014. She was named Para Athlete of the Year at the Scottish Athletics annual awards in 2015 and 2019. Lyle received the Findlay Calder trophy from Scottish Disability Sport in 2018 and 2020. She was named Glasgow Evening Times Young Scotswoman of the Year in 2019 for her athletics achievements and her work with disability and mental health charities.
