= 2016 IPC Athletics European Championships – Women's 100 metres =

The women's 100 metres at the 2016 IPC Athletics European Championships was held at the Stadio Olimpico Carlo Zecchini in Grosseto from 11–16 June.

Bronze medals were not awarded in the T34, T53 and T54 due to only three competitors being present in each race.

== Medalists ==
Event	Gold		Silver		Bronze	
T11	Alina Samigulina; Anatolii Bystrov (guide); Russia	13.08 CR	Joanna Mazur; Michal Stawicki (guide); Poland	13.14 PB	Ronja Oja; Jesper Oja (guide); Finland	13.57 PB
T12	Katrin Mueller-Rottgardt; Sebastian Fricke (guide); Germany	12.20 SB	Veronika Zotova; Dmitrii Slepov (guide); Russia	13.39 PB	Sara Fernandez Roldan; Spain	14.00
T13	Carolina Duarte; Portugal	12.87 CR	Arina Baranova; Russia	13.02 PB	Janne Sophie Engeleiter; Germany	13.27
T34	Veronika Doronina; Russia	20.10	Carly Tait; Great Britain	20.46	—	
T35	Maria Lyle; Great Britain	14.45 CR	Oxana Corso; Italy	15.28	Jagoda Kibil; Poland	16.46 SB
T37	Georgina Hermitage; Great Britain	13.85 CR	Anna Sapozhnikova; Russia	14.55	Zhanna Fekolina; Russia	14.99
T38	Sophie Hahn; Great Britain	12.87 CR	Margarita Goncharova; Russia	13.07	Anna Trener-Wierciak; Poland	13.53
T42	Martina Caironi; Italy	15.80	Vanessa Low; Germany	16.29	Monica Graziana Contrafatto; Italy	17.03
T44	Irmgard Bensusan; Germany	13.60	Laura Sugar; Great Britain	13.70	Abassia Rahmani (T43); Switzerland	14.78
T47	Alicja Fiodorow; Poland	12.78	Aleksandra Moguchaia (T46); Russia	12.88 PB	Angelina Lanza (T46); France	13.01 PB
T53	Hamide Kurt; Turkey	18.53	Akzhana Abdikarimova; Russia	19.06	—	
T54	Zubeyde Supurgeci; Turkey	18.02	Natalia Kocherova; Russia	18.61	—	
WR world record | AR area record | CR championship record | GR games record | NR national record | OR Olympic record | PB personal best | SB season best | WL world leading (in a given season)

== See also ==
- List of IPC world records in athletics
