= 2018 World Para Athletics European Championships – Men's 800 metres =

The men's 800 metres at the 2018 World Para Athletics European Championships was held at the Friedrich-Ludwig-Jahnsportpark in Berlin from 20 to 26 August. Five events were held over this distance.

== Medalists ==
Event	Gold		Silver		Bronze	
T20	Sandro Correira Baessa (POR)	1:54.80	Sywester Jaciuk (POL)	1:56.35	Daniel Pek (POL)	1:56.91
T34	Henry Manni (FIN)	1:52.26 CR	Ben Rowlings (GBR)	1:52.95	Bojan Mitic (SUI)	1:53.40
T36 (non-medal event)	José Manuel González (ESP)	2:27.01	José Pámpano (ESP)	2:33.83		
T53	Pierre Fairbank (FRA)	1:43.74 CR	Nicolas Brignone (FRA)	1:44.87	Diego Gastaldi (ITA)	1:51.25
T54	Marcel Hug (SUI)	1:39.89	Leo Pekka Tahti (FIN)	1:40.82	Nathan Maguire (GBR)	1:40.82
WR world record | AR area record | CR championship record | GR games record | NR national record | OR Olympic record | PB personal best | SB season best | WL world leading (in a given season)

== See also ==
- List of IPC world records in athletics
