= 2016 IPC Athletics European Championships – Men's 400 metres =

The men's 400 metres at the 2016 IPC Athletics European Championships was held at the Stadio Olimpico Carlo Zecchini in Grosseto from 11–16 June.

== Medalists ==
Event	Gold		Silver		Bronze	
T12	Joan Munar Martinez; Spain	50.11 CR	Jose Luis Fernandez Taular; Spain	50.87 PB	—	
T13	Egor Sharov; Russia	48.37 ER	Aleksei Labzin; Russia	50.16 SB	Hakan Cira; Turkey	51.03 PB
T20	Rodrigue Massianga; France	48.65 CR	Artem Muratov; Russia	48.93	Maksim Ovcharenko; Russia	48.95 PB
T34	Henry Manni; Finland	52.46 CR	Isaac Towers; Great Britain	54.22	Ben Rowlings; Great Britain	54.41 SB
T36	Evgenii Shvetcov; Russia	55.47	Krzysztof Ciuksza; Poland	56.48 PB	Artem Arefyev; Russia	57.62
T38	Andrei Vdovin; Russia	50.52 WR	Chermen Kobesov; Russia	51.83	Lorenzo Albaladejo Martinez; Spain	55.35
T44	Johannes Floors (T43); Germany	48.67 CR	David Behre (T43); Germany	49.71 SB	Emanuele di Marino; Italy	55.83 SB
T47	Aleksei Kotlov; Russia	49.81 CR	Antonis Aresti; Cyprus	50.44	Alexander Pototschnig; Austria	52.93 PB
T51	Peter Genyn; Belgium	1:18.09 WR	Alvise de Vidi; Italy	1:24.48 SB	Toni Piispanen; Finland	1:25.98 SB
T52	Thomas Geierspichler; Austria	1:01.61 CR	Beat Bösch; Switzerland	1:03.50 SB	Mário Trindade; Portugal	1:07.12 SB
T53	Vitalii Gritsenko; Russia	49.01 CR	Moatez Jomni; Great Britain	49.40 PB	Mickey Bushell; Great Britain	51.04 SB
T54	David Weir; Great Britain	46.10 CR	Richard Chiassaro; Great Britain	46.46 PB	Aleksei Bychenok; Russia	46.62
WR world record | AR area record | CR championship record | GR games record | NR national record | OR Olympic record | PB personal best | SB season best | WL world leading (in a given season)

== See also ==
- List of IPC world records in athletics
