= 2016 IPC Athletics European Championships – Men's 4 × 400 metres relay =

4 x 400m relay competition

The men's 4 × 400 metres relay at the 2016 IPC Athletics European Championships were held at the Stadio Olimpico Carlo Zecchini in Grosseto from 11–16 June. The men's T53/54 relay was a non-medal event.

== Medalists ==
Event	Gold		Silver	Bronze
T53/T54	Richard Chiassaro (T54); Nathan Maguire (T54); Moatez Jomni (T53); David Weir (T54); Great Britain	3:08.30 NR		
WR world record | AR area record | CR championship record | GR games record | NR national record | OR Olympic record | PB personal best | SB season best | WL world leading (in a given season)

== See also ==
- List of IPC world records in athletics
