= Zübeyde Süpürgeci =

Turkish Paralympic athlete

Personal information
- Born: 20 July 1993 (age 32) Tuzluca, Turkey
- Height: 100 cm (sitting)
- Weight: 40 kg (88 lb)

Sport
- Country: Turkey
- Sport: Athletics
- Disability class: T53/T54
- Club: Bağcılar Belediyesi Disabled SK
- Coached by: Ömer Cantay
Medal record
Women's para-athletics
Representing Turkey
World Championships
Silver medal – second place	2025 New Delhi	100m T54
European Championships
Gold medal – first place	2016 Grosseto	100m T54
Gold medal – first place	2018 Berlin	200m T54
Gold medal – first place	2021 Bydgoszcz	100m T54
Silver medal – second place	2016 Grosseto	200m T54
Silver medal – second place	2021 Bydgoszcz	400m T54
Bronze medal – third place	2012 Stadskanaal	100m T54
Bronze medal – third place	2014 Swansea	100m T54
IPC Grand Prix - Athletics
Bronze medal – third place	2016	100m T54
Silver medal – second place	2016	4x400m relay T53/T54
Mediterranean Games
Gold medal – first place	2018 Tarragona	800 m T54

Zübeyde Süpürgeci (born 20 July 1993) is a Turkish Paralympian athlete competing in the T54 disability class events of 100m, 400m and 800m as well as T53/T54 class 4 × 400 m relay event.

== Early years ==
Zübeyde Süpürgeci was born on 20 July 1993. She was disabled from birth. Until the age of 16, she did not even want to go out. She discovered a new world when people around her took her to the Disableds' Palace of Bağcılar Municipality. Her younger brother Muhammet was also born disabled.

== Sporting career ==
Süpürgeci started with para athletics in 2011. She began her sporting career through her coach Ömer Cantay. In 2012, she was admitted to the para-athletics team of Bağcılar Belediyesi Disabled SK in Istanbul.

In 2012, she captured the gold medal in the 100m T54 event at the Czech Open - Athletics tournament held in Olomouc. She became bronze medalist in the 100m T54 event at the 2012 IPC Athletics European Championships in Stadskanaal, Netherlands.

Süpürgeci finished the women's wheelchair category of the 2013 Istanbul Marathon at second place in 2:58:30 following her clubmate Hamide Kurt.

She took the bronze medal in the 100m T54 event at the 2014 IPC Athletics European Championships in Swansea, Wales, United Kingdom.

At the 2016 IPC Athletics European Championships in Grosseto, Italy, she won the gold medal in the 100m T54 and the silver medal in the 200m T54 event.

At the 8th FAZAA leg of the IPC Athletics 2016 Grand Prix in Dubai, United Arab Emirates, which was a 2016 Paralympics qualifier, she won the bronze medal in the 200m T54 event and the gold medal in the 400m T54 event. She became bronze medalist in the 100m T54 and silver medalist in the 4 × 400 m relay T53/T54 event of the 2016 IPC Grand Prix.

Süpürgeci competed at the 2016 Paralympics in Rio de Janeiro, Brazil.

She won the gold medal in the 800 m T54 event at the 2018 Mediterranean Games held in Tarragona, Spain. She became European champion in the 200m T54 event at the 2018 IPC Athletics European Championships in Berlin, Germany breaking the championship record with 30.96. She captured the gold medal in the 100m T54 event of the 2021 World Para Athletics European Championships in Bydgoszcz, Poland, and set a championship record with 16.83. She won further the silver medal in the 400m T54 event in the same championship.
