= 2016 IPC Athletics European Championships – Men's 100 metres =

The men's 100 metres at the 2016 IPC Athletics European Championships was held at the Stadio Olimpico Carlo Zecchini in Grosseto from 11 to 16 June.

== Medalists ==
Event	Gold		Silver		Bronze	
T11	Timothée Adolphe; Gautier Simounet (guide); France	11.43 CR	Andrei Koptev; Sergey Petrichenko (guide); Russia	11.70	Martin Parejo Maza; Timoteo Stewart Ortiz (guide); Spain	11.98
T12	Artem Loginov; Russia	11.12	Fedor Trikolich; Russia	11.32	Gabriel Potra; Portugal	11.64 SB
T13	Mateusz Michalski; Poland	10.98 SB	Radoslav Zlatanov; Bulgaria	11.02 SB	Philipp Handler; Switzerland	11.12
T33	Toby Gold; Great Britain	17.64	Dan Bramall; Great Britain	18.27	—	
T34	Henry Manni; Finland	15.86 CR	Sebastien Mobre; France	16.56	Ben Rowlings; Great Britain	16.67
T35	Artem Kalashian; Russia	12.95	Dmitrii Safronov; Russia	13.03	Jordan Howe; Great Britain	13.13 SB
T36	Evgenii Torsunov; Russia	12.27	Graeme Ballard; Great Britain	12.34 SB	Benjamin Erban; Slovakia	14.01 PB
T38	Andrei Vdovin (T37); Russia	11.98	Gocha Khugaev (T37); Russia	11.99	Andrei Poroshin; Russia	12.09
T42	Richard Whitehead; Great Britain	12.21 CR	Anton Prokhorov; Russia	12.24	Daniel Jorgensen; Denmark	12.27 PB
T44	Jonnie Peacock; Great Britain	11.18	Felix Streng; Germany	11.20	Johannes Floors (T43); Germany	11.60 CR
T47	Michal Derus; Poland	11.14	Aleksei Kotlov; Russia	11.38	Vadim Trunov; Russia	11.56
T51	Peter Genyn; Belgium	20.78 CR	Toni Piispanen; Finland	20.92	Stephen Osborne; Great Britain	22.05
T52	Beat Bösch; Switzerland	18.72	Mário Trindade; Portugal	19.55	Artem Shishkovskiy; Spain	20.74
T53	Mickey Bushell; Great Britain	15.53 CR	Vitalii Gritsenko; Russia	15.93	Moatez Jomni; Great Britain	16.20
T54	Leo Pekka Tähti; Finland	14.43	Richard Chiassaro; United Kingdom	14.82	Aleksei Bychenok; Russia	15.00
WR world record | AR area record | CR championship record | GR games record | NR national record | OR Olympic record | PB personal best | SB season best | WL world leading (in a given season)

== See also ==
- List of IPC world records in athletics
