= 2016 IPC Athletics European Championships – Women's 200 metres =

The women's 200 metres at the 2016 IPC Athletics European Championships was held at the Stadio Olimpico Carlo Zecchini in Grosseto from 11–16 June.

== Medalists ==
Event	Gold		Silver		Bronze	
T11	Joanna Mazur; Michal Stawicki (guide); Poland	26.73 CR	Alina Samigulina; Anatolii Bystrov (guide); Russia	27.10	Arjola Dedaj; Italy	28.39
T12	Katrin Mueller-Rottgardt; Sebastian Fricke (guide); Germany	24.29 CR	Anna Kulinich-Sorokina; Russia	25.79	Malgorzata Ignasiak; Poland	26.70 PB
T13	Nantenin Keïta; France	25.69 CR	Carolina Duarte; Portugal	26.13 PB	Janne Sophie Engeleiter; Germany	27.82 PB
T35	Maria Lyle; Great Britain	29.91 CR	Oxana Corso; Italy	33.09	Jagoda Kibil; Poland	34.80
T37	Georgina Hermitage; Great Britain	27.21 WR	Anna Sapozhnikova; Russia	29.80	Natalia Jasinska; Poland	31.26
T38	Margarita Goncharova; Russia	26.46 WR	Sophie Hahn; Great Britain	26.67 PB	Kadeena Cox; Great Britain	27.40 PB
T44	Irmgard Bensusan; Germany	27.70	Giuseppina Versace (T43); Italy	28.07	Laura Sugar; Great Britain	28.29
T47	Alicja Fiodorow; Poland	25.83 CR	Aleksandra Moguchaia; Russia	26.02 PB	Angelina Lanza; France	26.65 PB
T53/T54	Natalia Kocherova (T54); Russia	31.47 CR	Zubeyde Supurgeci (T54); Turkey	32.09	Alexandra Helbling (T54); Switzerland	32.67 SB
WR world record | AR area record | CR championship record | GR games record | NR national record | OR Olympic record | PB personal best | SB season best | WL world leading (in a given season)

== See also ==
- List of IPC world records in athletics
