= Joan Munar =

Spanish Paralympic athlete (born 1996)

Personal information
- Full name: Joan Munar Martínez
- Nationality: Spanish
- Born: 1 February 1996 (age 30) Palma de Mallorca, Balearic Islands, Spain

Sport
- Country: Spain
- Sport: Track and field (T12)
Medal record
Men's para athletics
Representing Spain
Paralympic Games
Bronze medal – third place	2024 Paris	Long jump T11
World Championships
Bronze medal – third place	2017 London	100 m T12
Bronze medal – third place	2023 Paris	Long jump T11
European Championships
Gold medal – first place	2012 Stadskanaal	100 m T13
Gold medal – first place	2012 Stadskanaal	200 m T13
Gold medal – first place	2016 Grosseto	400 m T12
Silver medal – second place	2014 Swansea	200 m T12
Bronze medal – third place	2016 Grosseto	200 m T12
Bronze medal – third place	2014 Swansea	100 m T12
Bronze medal – third place	2014 Swansea	4×100 m relay T11–13

Joan Munar Martínez (born 1 February 1996 in Palma de Mallorca, Balearic Islands) is a Paralympic athlete from Spain competing mainly in category T12 track and field events. He has a vision impairment.

== Personal life ==
Munar was born on 1 February 1996 in Palma de Mallorca, Balearic Islands, Spain. He has a vision impairment. He lived in the Baleric Islands.

== Athletics ==
Munar is a Paralympic T12 track and field athlete. He does not race with a sighted guide.

Munar has won the Mallorca Athletics Region Championship. In 2011, he won the Spanish national championship. He competed at the 2012 IPC European Athletics Championships and earned two golds in the 100 meter and 200 meter events. One of his golds came in the 200 meters. He competed in the 2012 Summer Paralympics in London, England where he finished 12th in the 100 meters and had a DNF in the 4 X 100 meter race. The 100 meters was his first race of the Games. He ran in the semi-finals with his guide in the 4 × 100 meter race on the seventh day of the Games. He was one of twenty-four members of the Spanish athletics team. Competing at the Games as a 16-year-old, he was the youngest member of the athletics team. In May 2013, he competed in the Spanish national championships, where he earned a gold medal in the 200 meters and a silver in the 100 meters. In July 2013, he participated in the 2013 IPC Athletics World Championships.
