= Hasan Hüseyin Kaçar =

Turkish runner

Personal information
- Born: 11 July 1988 (age 37)

Sport
- Sport: Para-athletics
- Club: Çankaya Belediyesi SK
Medal record
Para-athletics
Representing Turkey
IPC Athletics World Championships
Bronze medal – third place	2013 Lyon	800m T11
Bronze medal – third place	2015 Doha	1500m T11
IPC Athletics European Championships
Silver medal – second place	2014 Swansea	5000m T11
Gold medal – first place	2016 Grosseto	5000m T11
Silver medal – second place	2016 Grosseto	1500m T11

Hasan Hüseyin Kaçar (born 11 July 1988) is a Turkish middle and long distance runner competing in the T11 class.

Hasan Hüseyin Kaçar began his sporting career in 2006. He competes for Çankaya Belediyesi SK in Ankara.

Kaçar competed at the 2013 IPC Athletics World Championships held in Lyon, France, and won the bronze medal in the 800m T11 event.

In 2013, he took the bronze medal in the 800m T11 event at the 2013 IPC Athletics World Championships in Lyon, France. In 2015, he took the bronze medal in the 1500m T11 event at the 2015 IPC Athletics World Championships in Doha, Qatar.

Kaçar captured the silver medal in the 5000m T11 event at the 2014 IPC Athletics European Championships in Swansea, Wales, UK.

In 2016, he took the gold medal in the 5000m T11 event and he won the silver medal in the 1500m T11 event at the 2016 IPC Athletics European Championships in Grosseto, Italy.

He represented his country at the 2016 Paralympics in Rio de Janeiro, Brazil competing in the 1500m T11 and 5000m T11 events. He finished fourth place in the 5000m T11 event at the 2016 Paralympics in Rio de Janeiro, Brazil.
