= 2016 IPC Athletics European Championships – Men's 800 metres =

GotaGoGama

The men's 800 metres at the 2016 IPC Athletics European Championships was held at the Stadio Olimpico Carlo Zecchini in Grosseto from 11–16 June.

== Medalists ==
Event	Gold		Silver		Bronze	
T13	Egor Sharov; Russia	1:55.26 CR	Aleksandr Kostin; Russia	2:00.36	Abel Ciorap; Romania	2:05.61 PB
T20	Alexander Rabotnitskiy; Russia	1:56.89	Sylwester Jaciuk; Poland	1:57.38 PB	Daniel Pek; Poland	1:57.71
T34	Isaac Towers; Great Britain	1:44.67 CR	Henry Manni; Finland	1:45.14 PB	Ben Rowlings; Great Britain	1:49.14
T36	Evgenii Shvetcov; Russia	2:08.14	Artem Arefyev; Russia	2:08.71	Krzysztof Ciuksza; Poland	2:17.62 PB
T38	Louis Radius; France	2:06.11	Leonid Varfolomeev (T37); Russia	2:09.03	Christoffer Schultz Vienberg; Denmark	2:12.68 PB
T53	Vitalii Gritsenko; Russia	1:40.56 CR	Moatez Jomni; Great Britain	1:43.36	Heinz Frei; Switzerland	1:44.48 SB
T54	David Weir; Great Britain	1:35.51	Richard Chiassaro; Great Britain	1:35.65	Aleksei Bychenok; Russia	1:35.67
WR world record | AR area record | CR championship record | GR games record | NR national record | OR Olympic record | PB personal best | SB season best | WL world leading (in a given season)

== See also ==
- List of IPC world records in athletics
