= Carolina Duarte =

Portuguese Paralympic athlete

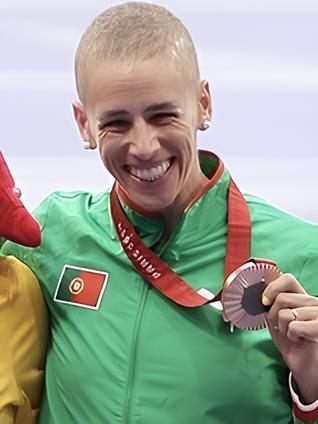

Personal information
- Nickname: Carol
- Nationality: Portuguese
- Born: 8 January 1990 (age 36)
- Website: No

Sport
- Country: Portugal
- Sport: Sprints
- Club: CS Maritimo

Achievements and titles
- Regional finals: 2012 European Championships
Medal record
Women's para-athletics
Representing Portugal
Paralympic Games
Bronze medal – third place	2024 Paris	400 m T13
World Championships
Silver medal – second place	2023 Paris	400 m T13
Silver medal – second place	2024 Kobe	400 m T13
European Championships
Gold medal – first place	2016 Grosseto	100 m T13
Silver medal – second place	2016 Grosseto	200 m T13
Bronze medal – third place	2016 Grosseto	400 m T13

Carolina Duarte (born 8 January 1990) is a track and field athlete from Portugal competing mainly sprint events. Duarte has competed in both disabled and non-disabled sporting competitions. In disability sport she competes as a T13 athlete, a classification for athletes who are visually impaired.

== Athletics career ==
=== As an athlete in non-disability events ===
Duarte began her athletics career competing in mainstream track and field events. Her early personal bests, set in 2010, were all in short distance sprints, setting a time of 12.17 in the 100 metres. As her career progressed she gravitated towards the 400 metres event and also competed in the 400 metres hurdles. In 2012, she was selected to join the Portugal team that competed at the 2012 European Athletics Championships, competing as part of the Women's 4 × 400 metres relay.

=== As a disability athlete ===
Due to reduced vision, Duarte was able to become classified as a T13 track and field athlete. In 2016, she was selected for the Portugal national team that competed at the IPC Athletics European Championships in Grosseto. There she competed in three events, the T13 100m, 200m and 400m sprints. In her first event, the 200 metres, she was edged into second place by France's Nantenin Keïta, who set a championship record to take the gold medal. Duarte followed this with a bronze in the 400 metres. On the penultimate day she competed in the 100 metres, and despite not running a personal best, Duarte set a championship record with a time of 12.87s.
