= 2016 IPC Athletics European Championships – Women's 5000 metres =

The women's 5000 metres at the 2016 IPC Athletics European Championships was held at the Stadio Olimpico Carlo Zecchini in Grosseto from 11–16 June.

== Medalists ==
Event	Gold		Silver		Bronze
T54	Natalia Kocherova; Russia	11:58.04 CR	Gunilla Wallengren; Sweden	12:03.08 PB	—
WR world record | AR area record | CR championship record | GR games record | NR national record | OR Olympic record | PB personal best | SB season best | WL world leading (in a given season)

== See also ==
- List of IPC world records in athletics
