= 2018 World Para Athletics European Championships – Men's 200 metres =

The men's 200 metres at the 2018 World Para Athletics European Championships was held at the Friedrich-Ludwig-Jahn-Sportpark in Berlin, Germany from 20 to 26 August.

== Medalists ==
| Event | Gold | | Silver | | Bronze | |
|---|---|---|---|---|---|---|
| T11 | Mehmet Tunc (TUR) guide : Mehmet Tetik | 24.62 | Sylvaine Bova (FRA) guide: Germaine Haewegene | 24.77 | no medal awarded due to disqualifications | |
| T12 | Luis Goncalves (POR) | 23.12 | Athanasios Ghavelas (GRE) | 23.20 | Abel Ciorap (ROU) | 23.69 |
| T13 | Jason Smyth (IRL) | 21.44 | Mateusz Michalski (POL) | 21.87 | Philipp Handler (SUI) | 23.45 |
| T35 | Ihor Tsvietov (UKR) | 26.10 | no medals awarded | | | |
| T36 | Krzysztof Ciuksza (POL) | 25.39 | Roman Pavlyk (UKR) | 25.41 | Graeme Ballard (GBR) | 25.58 |
| T37 | Michal Krotkowski (POL) | 24.10 | Vladyslav Zahrebelnyi (UKR) | 24.53 | Yaroslav Okipinksyi (UKR) | 24.82 |
| T38 | Thomas Young (GBR) | 23.70 | Mykyta Senyk (UKR) | 23.98 | Lorenzo Albaladejo Martinez (ESP) | 24.59 |
| T47 | Michal Derus (POL) | 22.38 CR | Andonis Aresti (CYP) | 22.71 | Riccardo Bagaini (ITA) | 23.23 |
| T51 | Peter Genyn (BEL) | 42.26 CR | Toni Piispanen (FIN) | 42.49 | Stephen Osborne (GBR) | 47.35 |
| T53 | Pierre Fairbank (FRA) | 26.92 | Nicolas Brignone (FRA) | 27.65 | Moatez Jomni (GBR) | 29.06 |
| T54 | Leo Pekka Tahti (FIN) | 24.74 | Kenny van Weeghel (NED) | 25.67 | Nathan Maguire (GBR) | 36.05 |
| T61 | Richard Whitehead (GBR) | 24.22 | Ali Lacin (GER) | 27.39 | no medal awarded | |
| T63 | Johannes Floors (GER) | 21.37 | Stylianos Malakopoulos (GRE) | 24.43 | Andrea Lanfri (ITA) | 24.82 |
| T64 | Felix Streng (GER) | 21.88 | Ronald Hertog (NED) | 23.00 | Simone Manigrasso (ITA) | 23.11 |
WR world record | AR area record | CR championship record | GR games record | NR national record | OR Olympic record | PB personal best | SB season best | WL world leading (in a given season) no medal awarded : Unless otherwise stated, only gold is awarded in field of two, and gold and silver in field less than four.

== See also ==
- List of IPC world records in athletics
