= Engeleiter =

Engeleiter is a surname. Notable people with the surname include:

- Janne Sophie Engeleiter (born 1995), German Paralympic athlete
- Susan Engeleiter (born 1952), American politician
