= Mickey Bushell =

British Paralympic athlete (born 1990)

Mickey Bushell MBE
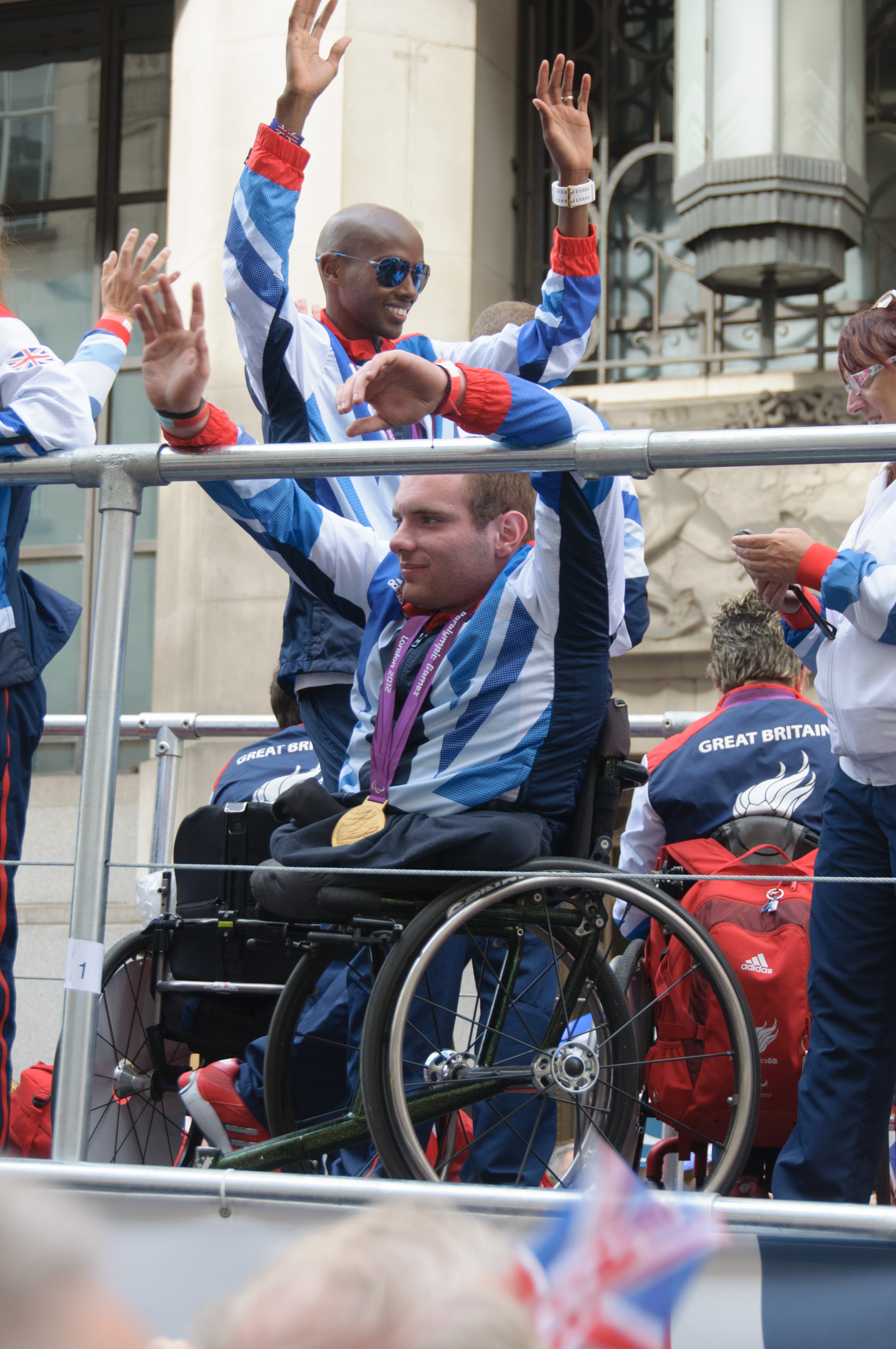
- Mickey Bushell with Mo Farah

Personal information
- Born: 8 June 1990 (age 36) Shrewsbury, England
- Occupation: Personal trainer

Sport
- Country: United Kingdom
- Sport: Track and field
- Disability class: T53
- Events: 100m, 200m, 400m, 800m
- Team: Great Britain
Medal record
Men's paralympic athletics
Representing Great Britain
Paralympic Games
Gold medal – first place	2012 London	100 m T53
Silver medal – second place	2008 Beijing	100 m T53
World Championships
Silver medal – second place	2011 Christchurch	100 m T53
Silver medal – second place	2013 Lyon	100 m T53
Silver medal – second place	2017 London	100 m T53
European Championships
Gold medal – first place	2014 Swansea	100 m T53
Gold medal – first place	2016 Grosseto	100 m T53
Silver medal – second place	2014 Swansea	200 m T53
Bronze medal – third place	2016 Grosseto	400 m T53
- Updated on 27 March 2015

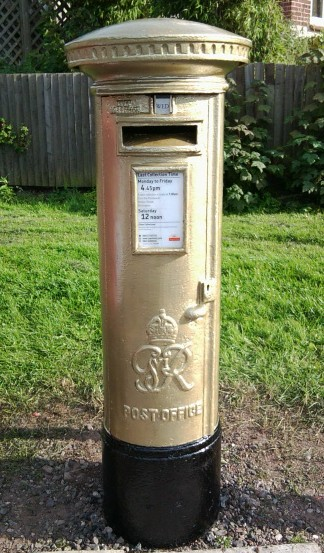
Gold post box on the corner of Arleston Lane and Wollam Road, Arleston, Telford

Michael David Bushell MBE (born 8 June 1990) is a Paralympic gold medalist and personal trainer from Telford, Shropshire, England. He has lumbar sacral spinal agenesis congenital paraplegia and competes in T53 category sprint events. He is the British record holder at 100m and 200, and a European record holder at 100m.

== Early life ==
Bushell was born on 8 June 1990 at the Royal Shrewsbury Hospital. Bushell surprised everyone when he started crawling around and eventually walking on his hands in a handstand even though the docters said he would be unable to move.

== Athletic career ==
Bushell competed in the 2008 Summer Paralympics in Beijing, China winning silver in the men's T53100 metres – T53 event. He also competed in the 200m event, but was knocked out in the first round.

On 19 June 2009, Bushell set a new 100 m T53 world record in Ibach, Switzerland, beating the old record by three one-hundredths of a second.

On 3 September, in the London 2012 Paralympics, he won a gold medal for Great Britain in the T53 100m in a time of 14.75 seconds, just shy of the World Record time of 14.47 seconds.

He added further silverware to his collection in 2014 at the IPC Athletics European Championships in Swansea, where he claimed gold in the T53 100m. He picked up a silver medal in the 200m in wet and windy conditions, but was just edged out of the medals in the 800m behind his teammate, Moatez Jomni.

After struggling with illness in 2015, Bushell made an encouraging return to action in 2016 by winning the European title in the T53 100m in Grosseto, as well as a 400m bronze. Later that year he competed in the 2016 Paralympic games in Rio defending his 100m, although was only able to manage a disappointing sixth-place finish crossing the line in 15.09s.

Bushell is the current British Record holder for the T53 class in the 100m and 200m events, and also the European record holder at 100m.

== Health issues ==
Bushell has lumbar sacral spinal agenesis congenital paraplegia. In Bushell's case this means he is missing seven vertebrae from the lower part of the spine just above the coccyx. He has no abdominal wall muscle control, his legs and hips have never fully developed and float unsupported at the lower end of his body.

In 2007, during his preparations for the Paralympic games in Beijing, Bushell began having recurrent kidney infection necessitating a nephrectomy. Despite this potentially career ending condition just three months after the operation he recorded a personal best in the 100m to qualify for the Beijing Paralympics, where he won a silver in the T53.

Shoulder and elbow injuries in 2013 and 2014 further threatened his career, but despite this he still managed to claim silver at the IPC World Championships in Lyon and two medals at the IPC European Championships in Swansea.

Recurrent urinary tract infections in 2015 culminated in life-threatening septicaemia. At the time this was incorrectly reported by the BBC as a chlamydia infection. He subsequently made a complete recovery, although his training was significantly set back the seven month recuperation period.

== Awards and honors ==
After winning gold in London 2012 Bushell was honored with a golden postbox in his home town of Telford.

He was appointed Member of the Order of the British Empire (MBE) in the 2013 New Year Honours for services to athletics.

== Personal life ==
Bushell lives in Telford where he works as a body language coach.

== See also ==
- 2012 Summer Olympics and Paralympics gold post boxes
