= Mehmet Tunç =

Turkish Paralympic athlete

Personal information
- Nationality: Turkish
- Born: 15 August 1997 (age 28)

Sport
- Country: Turkey
- Sport: Para-athletics
- Disability class: T11
- Events: Sprints, Long Jump
- Club: Gaziantep BB Disabled SK
Medal record
Men's athletics
Representing Turkey
IPC Athletics European Championships
Silver medal – second place	2016 Grosseto	200m T11

Mehmet Tunç (born 15 August 1997) is a Turkish male Paralympian athlete competing in the T11 disability class of the sprint and long jump events. He is a member of Gaziantep BB Disabled SK.

He won the silver medal in the 200m T11 event at the 2016 IPC Athletics European Championships held in Grosseto, Italy.

He competed in the 200m T11, 400m T11 and Men's long jump T11 events at the 2016 Paralympics in Rio de Janeiro, Brazil.
