= 2016 IPC Athletics European Championships – Women's 800 metres =

The women's 800 metres at the 2016 IPC Athletics European Championships was held at the Stadio Olimpico Carlo Zecchini in Grosseto from 11 to 16 June. Due to a lack of competitors, the T34 was declared a non-medal event.

== Medalists ==
| Event | Gold | | Silver | | Bronze | |
|---|---|---|---|---|---|---|
| T20 | Arleta Meloch; Poland | 2:18.10 WR | Bernadett Biacsi; Hungary | 2:20.80 PB | Mariia Koltcova; Russia | 2:25.12 |
| T34 † | Carly Tait; Great Britain | 2:18.98 | — | | — | |
| T54 | Natalia Kocherova; Russia | 1:53.07 CR | Gunilla Wallengren; Sweden | 1.54.96 SB | Hamide Kurt (T53); Turkey | 1:57.22 CR |
WR world record | AR area record | CR championship record | GR games record | NR national record | OR Olympic record | PB personal best | SB season best | WL world leading (in a given season)

† This race was a non medal event.

== See also ==
- List of IPC world records in athletics
