= 2016 IPC Athletics European Championships – Men's club throw =

The men's club throw at the 2016 IPC Athletics European Championships was held at the Stadio Olimpico Carlo Zecchini in Grosseto from 11–16 June.

== Medalists ==
Event	Gold		Silver		Bronze	
F32	Maciej Sochal; Poland	37.19 WR	Vladislav Frolov; Russia	36.13 PB	Stephen Miller; Great Britain	30.92 SB
F51	Zeljko Dimitrijevic; Serbia	27.04 WR	Radim Běleš; Czech Republic	24.32	Marián Kuřeja; Slovakia	23.73
WR world record | AR area record | CR championship record | GR games record | NR national record | OR Olympic record | PB personal best | SB season best | WL world leading (in a given season)

== See also ==
- List of IPC world records in athletics
