= Natalia Kocherova =

Russian wheelchair racer and cross-country skier

Personal information
- Nationality: Russian
- Born: 23 February 1990 (age 36) Yegorovka, Omsk region RUSSIA
- Height: 1.76 m (5 ft 9 in)
- Weight: 51 kg (112 lb)

Sport
- Country: Russia
- Sport: Wheelchair racing, Cross-country skiing
- Club: Rezept-sport
- Coached by: Gromova Irina
Medal record
Representing Russia
Nordic skiing/Biathlon
IPC Biathlon and Cross-Country Skiing World Championships
Gold medal – first place	2015 Cable	12.5km Individual - Sitting
Bronze medal – third place	2015 Cable	4 x 2.5km Relay Mixed
IPC Athletics European Championships
Gold medal – first place	2016 Grosseto	200m T53/54
Gold medal – first place	2016 Grosseto	400m T54
Gold medal – first place	2016 Grosseto	800m T54
Gold medal – first place	2016 Grosseto	1500m T54
Gold medal – first place	2016 Grosseto	5000m T54
Silver medal – second place	2016 Grosseto	100m T54

Natalia Kocherova (born 23 February 1990) is a Russian Paralympic wheelchair and cross-country skier from Omsk.

== Early life ==
Kocherova was born in Yegorovka, Russia in 1990. An accident resulted in her right leg being amputated above the knee.

== Skiing career ==
Kocherova first major international event as a Nordic skier was at the 2014 Winter Paralympics in Sochi. There she competed in two events, the 12 km Free (sitting) where she finished ninth, and the 1 km Sprint (sitting), which after taking the twelfth and final spot during qualification, she qualified for the final, finishing in fifth position.

The following year she qualified for the 2015 IPC Biathlon and Cross-Country Skiing World Championships in Cable, Wisconsin. Kocherova entered three events in the biathlon, winning a bronze medal in the 12.5 km Individual (Sitting). She followed this with four events in the cross-country, and was part of the gold medal-winning Russian team in the 4 x 2.5 km mixed relay.

She won the bronze medal in the women's 6 km sitting biathlon event at the 2021 World Para Snow Sports Championships held in Lillehammer, Norway. She also won the silver medal in the women's 10 km sitting biathlon event.

== Track and field career ==
2015 saw Kocherova qualify for the Russian team for the 2015 IPC Athletics World Championships. She entered seven events, including all distances in the T54: 100m, 200m, 400m, 800m, 1500m, and 5000m. Her best result was fourth in the 800m. The next year she entered the 2016 IPC Athletics European Championships, and became the tournaments most successful athlete after winning five gold and a single silver medal. At Grosseto she set championship records in the 200m, 400m, 800m, 1500m and 5000m races.
