= 2014 IPC Athletics European Championships – Men's 800 metres =

The men's 800 metres at the 2014 IPC Athletics European Championships was held at the Swansea University Stadium from 18–23 August. There were only final events taken place; no heats events were contested.

== Medalists ==
Event	Gold		Silver		Bronze	
T34	Henry Manni; Finland	1:54.61	Isaac Towers; Great Britain	1:55.18	Ben Rowlings; Great Britain	1:56.11
T36	Artem Arefyev; Russia	2:11.74	Andrey Zhirnov; Russia	2:19.38	José Manuel González; Spain	2:25.70
T38	Michael McKillop; Ireland	1:58.16	Chermen Kobesov; Russia	2:06.11	Valentyn Miedviediev; Ukraine	2:16.57
T53	Pierre Fairbank; France	1:47.73	Roger Puigbò i Verdaguer; Spain	1:48.46	Moatez Jomni; Great Britain	1:53.30
T54	Marcel Hug; Switzerland	1:37.77	Kenny van Weeghel; Netherlands	1:39.31	Marc Schuh; Germany	1:40.11

== Results ==
=== T34 ===
Rank	Sport Class	Name	Nationality	Time	Notes
1st place, gold medalist(s)	T34	Henry Manni	Finland	1:54.61	
2nd place, silver medalist(s)	T34	Isaac Towers	United Kingdom	1:55.18	
3rd place, bronze medalist(s)	T34	Ben Rowlings	United Kingdom	1:56.11	
4	T34	Tuomas Manni	Finland	1:58.40	PB
5	T34	Sebastien Mobre	France	2:02.04	
6	T34	Bojan Mitic	Switzerland	2:02.11	
7	T34	Bart Pijs	Netherlands	2:14.71	
8	T34	Henk Schuiling	Netherlands	2:15.71	

=== T36 ===
Rank	Sport Class	Name	Nationality	Time	Notes
1st place, gold medalist(s)	T36	Artem Arefyev	Russia	2:11.74	
2nd place, silver medalist(s)	T36	Andrey Zhirnov	Russia	2:19.38	
3rd place, bronze medalist(s)	T36	Jose Manuel Gonzalez	Spain	2:25.70	
4	T36	Jose Pampano	Spain	2:26.33	

=== T38 ===
Rank	Sport Class	Name	Nationality	Time	Notes
1st place, gold medalist(s)	T37	Michael McKillop	Ireland	1:58.16	
2nd place, silver medalist(s)	T37	Chermen Kobesov	Russia	2:06.11	PB
3rd place, bronze medalist(s)	T37	Valentyn Miedviediev	Ukraine	2:16.57	
4	T38	Basile Meunier	Belgium	2:20.14	PB
—	T37	Petar Udovicic	Serbia	DQ	

=== T53 ===
Rank	Sport Class	Name	Nationality	Time	Notes
1st place, gold medalist(s)	T53	Pierre Fairbank	France	1:47.73	
2nd place, silver medalist(s)	T53	Roger Puigbo Verdaguer	Spain	1:48.46	
3rd place, bronze medalist(s)	T53	Moatez Jomni	United Kingdom	1:53.30	
4	T53	Mickey Bushell	United Kingdom	2:00.83	
5	T53	Artem Shishkovskiy	Russia	2:39.35	

=== T54 ===
Rank	Sport Class	Name	Nationality	Time	Notes
1st place, gold medalist(s)	T54	Marcel Hug	Switzerland	1:37.77	
2nd place, silver medalist(s)	T54	Kenny van Weeghel	Netherlands	1:39.31	
3rd place, bronze medalist(s)	T54	Marc Schuh	Germany	1:40.11	SB
4	T54	Julien Casoli	France	1:43.23	
5	T54	Alhassane Balde	Germany	1:43.63	

== See also ==
- List of IPC world records in athletics
