= 2016 IPC Athletics European Championships – Women's 4 × 100 metres relay =

The women's 4 × 100 metres relay at the 2016 IPC Athletics European Championships were held at the Stadio Olimpico Carlo Zecchini in Grosseto from 11 to 16 June.

== Medalists ==
Event	Gold		Silver	Bronze
T11-T13	Veronika Zotova (T12); Dmitrii Slepov Guide; Anna Kulinich-Sorokina (T12); Arina Baranova (T13); Alina Samigulina (T11); Anatolii Bystrov Guide; Russia	49.49 NR	—	—
T35-T38	Olivia Breen (T38); Maria Lyle (T35); Georgina Hermitage (T37); Sophie Hahn (T38); Great Britain	51.63 WR	—	—
WR world record | AR area record | CR championship record | GR games record | NR national record | OR Olympic record | PB personal best | SB season best | WL world leading (in a given season)

== See also ==
- List of IPC world records in athletics
