= Chermen Kobesov =

Russian Paralympic athlete

Personal information
- Nationality: Russian
- Born: 4 January 1996 (age 30) Elkhotovo, Russia

Sport
- Sport: Paralympic athletics
- Disability: Osteomyelitis
- Disability class: T37
Medal record
Women's para-athletics
Representing RPC
Paralympic Games
Bronze medal – third place	2020 Tokyo	400 m T37
Representing Russia
World Championships
Gold medal – first place	2013 Lyon	400 m T37
Silver medal – second place	2013 Lyon	long jymp T37/38
Silver medal – second place	2019 Dubai	100 m T37
Silver medal – second place	2019 Dubai	400 m T37
Bronze medal – third place	2019 Dubai	200 m T37
European Championships
Gold medal – first place	2016 Grosseto	long jump T37
Gold medal – first place	2016 Grosseto	200 m T38
Silver medal – second place	2014 Swansea	100 m T37
Silver medal – second place	2014 Swansea	200 m T37
Silver medal – second place	2014 Swansea	400 m T37
Silver medal – second place	2014 Swansea	800 m T37
Silver medal – second place	2016 Grosseto	200 m T38
Silver medal – second place	2021 Bydgoszcz	long jump T37
Bronze medal – third place	2015 Doha	100 m T37
Bronze medal – third place	2021 Bydgoszcz	100 m T37
Bronze medal – third place	2021 Bydgoszcz	200 m T37

Chermen Kobesov (born 4 January 1996) is a Russian para-athlete in the T37 classification. He represented Russian Paralympic Committee athletes at the 2020 Summer Paralympics.

== Paralympics ==
Kobesov represented Russian Paralympic Committee athletes at the 2020 Summer Paralympics in the 100 metres T37 event and finished in fourth place with a seasons best time of 11.32. He also competed in the 400 metres T37 event finished with a personal best time of 50.44 and won a bronze medal.

== MMA career ==
After the Russian Paralympic Committee was banned from the 2016 Paralympic Games in Rio de Janeiro, he decided to pursue a second sporting career in mixed martial arts.
