= Henry Manni =

Finnish athlete and paracanoeist

Personal information
- Nationality: Finnish
- Born: 18 June 1992 (age 34) Lahti, Finland

Sport
- Country: Finland
- Sport: paracanoe, athletics
- Disability class: T34
- Club: Lansi-Uudenmaan Urheilijat
- Coached by: Juha Flinck (FIN); Marko Hyytiainen (club)
Medal record
Representing Finland
Men's paracanoe
ICF Canoe Sprint World Championships
Bronze medal – third place	2010 Poznań	K-1 200 m TA
Men's athletics
Paralympic Games
Bronze medal – third place	2016 Rio de Janeiro	100 m T34
World Championships
Silver medal – second place	2015 Doha	400m - T34
Bronze medal – third place	2013 Lyon	200m - T34
Bronze medal – third place	2015 Doha	200m - T34
Bronze medal – third place	2015 Doha	800m - T34
Bronze medal – third place	2017 London	400m - T34
Bronze medal – third place	2024 Kobe	100m - T34
Bronze medal – third place	2024 Kobe	400m - T34
European Championships
Gold medal – first place	2014 Swansea	100m - T34
Gold medal – first place	2014 Swansea	200m - T34
Gold medal – first place	2014 Swansea	400m - T34
Gold medal – first place	2014 Swansea	800m - T34
Gold medal – first place	2016 Grosseto	100m - T34
Gold medal – first place	2016 Grosseto	200m - T34
Gold medal – first place	2016 Grosseto	400m - T34
Gold medal – first place	2018 Berlin	200 m T34
Gold medal – first place	2018 Berlin	400 m T34
Gold medal – first place	2021 Bydgoszcz	100 m T34
Silver medal – second place	2016 Grosseto	800m - T34
Silver medal – second place	2018 Berlin	100 m T34

Henry Manni (born 18 June 1992) is a Finnish athlete and paracanoeist who has competed and medaled in both fields at World Championship level. In Paracanoeing he won a bronze medal in the K-1 200 m TA event at the 2010 ICF Canoe Sprint World Championships in Poznań. Manni later switched to athletics as a wheelchair sprinter in the T34 classification. In 2013 he won a bronze in the World Championships in the 200m event, following this with four golds in the 2014 European Championships and three further World championship medals in 2015.

== Personal life ==
Manni was born in Lahti, Finland in 1992. He was born with paraparesis which saw his ability to walk unaided deteriorated from a young age. He obtained a degree in physical education from Pajulahti Sports Institute in Nastola. His younger brother Tuomas is also a para-athlete, competing in triathlon events.

== Paracanoeist ==
Manni was inspired to take up disability sport in 2004 after watching Finland's Leo-Pekka Tahti win gold at the Summer Paralympics in Athens. That year, at the age of ten, Manni took up paracanoeing. In 2010 he achieved his best paracanoe result when he won a bronze medal in the K-1 200 m TA event at the 2010 ICF Canoe Sprint World Championships in Poznań, Poland.

== Track athlete ==
After the 2010 Canoe World Championships Manni switched to track athletics and was classified as a T34 athlete. Specialising in sprint events he was selected for the Finland team at the 2013 IPC Athletics World Championships in Lyon. There he entered four events, the 100m, 200m, 400m and 800m sprints. He managed a podium finish in the 200m where he took bronze with a time of 30.70 seconds. The next year he travelled to Swansea where he competed in the 2014 IPC Athletics European Championships. Without the competition of international athletes such as Tunisia's Walid Ktila and Australia's Rheed McCracken, Manni dominated the field winning four gold medals in all four sprint events.

In the build up to the 2016 Summer Paralympics in Rio, Manni again represented Finland in the IPC World Championships, this time in Doha. He again entered all four sprint events in the T34 classification, and improved on all four times from his previous World Championship. In Doha he won a silver in the 400m and bronze in both the 200m and 800m events.
