= 2016 IPC Athletics European Championships – Men's 5000 metres =

The men's 5000 metres at the 2016 IPC Athletics European Championships was held at the Stadio Olimpico Carlo Zecchini in Grosseto from 11–16 June.

== Medalists ==
Event	Gold		Silver		Bronze	
T11	Hasan Huseyin Kacar; Muhammet Ugur Cakir (guide); Erdi Aksu (guide); Turkey	16:25.53	Manuel Garnica Roldán; Francisco Javier Castro Garrido (guide); Spain	16:31.64 SB	Nuno Alves; Ricardo Abreu (guide); Portugal	16:49.57
T13	Lukasz Wietecki; Poland	15:48.52	Patryk Lukaszewski; Poland	16:16.34	Matthias Boonen; Belgium	17:36.37
T54	David Weir; Great Britain	11:15.95	Aleksei Bychenok; Russia	11:16.46	Alhassane Balde; Germany	11:16.52
WR world record | AR area record | CR championship record | GR games record | NR national record | OR Olympic record | PB personal best | SB season best | WL world leading (in a given season)

== See also ==
- List of IPC world records in athletics
