= 2017 World Para Athletics Championships – Men's 400 metres =

The men's 400 metres at the 2017 World Para Athletics Championships was held at the Olympic Stadium in London from 14 to 23 July.

== Medalists ==
Event	Gold		Silver		Bronze	
T11	Gerard Descarrega Puigdevall; Guide: Marcos Blanquino Exposito; Spain	51.46	di Dongdong; Guide: Mao Deyi; China	53.38	—	
T12	Mahdi Afri; Morocco	48.60 CR	Luis Goncalves; Portugal	49.34 PB	Oguz Akbulut; Turkey	50.19 PB
T13	Mohamed Amguoun; Morocco	46.92 WR	Johannes Nambala; Namibia	48.40 SB	Mohamed Fouad Hamoumou; Algeria	48.65
T20	Daniel Martins; Brazil	47.66 CR	Damián Carcelén; Ecuador	49.20 PB	Deliber Rodriguez Ramirez; Spain	49.48
T34	Walid Ktila; Tunisia	50.56 CR	Mohamed Hammadi; United Arab Emirates	50.94	Henry Manni; Finland	52.24
T36	James Turner; Australia	54.27 AR	Krzysztof Ciuksza; Poland	55.19	Keegan Pitcher; New Zealand	55.23 PB
T37	Charl du Toit; South Africa	51.00 AR	Sofiane Hamdi; Algeria	53.68	Michał Kotkowski; Poland	53.95 PB
T38	Dyan Buis; South Africa	50.87 SB	Dixon De Jesus Hooker Velasquez; Colombia	51.18 AR	Weiner Javier Diaz Mosquera; Colombia	53.74
T43	Johannes Floors; Germany	46.67 CR	Hunter Woodhall; United States	47.23	AJ Digby; United States	47.56
T44	Michail Seitis; Greece	51.41	Simone Manigrasso; Italy	54.07 PB	Emanuele Di Marino; Italy	55.70
T47	Gunther Matzinger; Austria	49.35 SB	Shane Hudson; Jamaica	49.60 SB	Antonis Aresti; Cyprus	50.31 SB
T51	Peter Genyn; Belgium	1:21.63 CR	Edgar Cesareo Navarro Sanchez; Mexico	1:24.10	Helder Mestre; Portugal	1:25.65
T52	Tomoki Sato; Japan	56.78 CR	Raymond Martin; United States	57.31	Hirokazu Ueyonabaru; Japan	1:02.27 SB
T53	Brent Lakatos; Canada	47.56 CR	Pongsakorn Paeyo; Thailand	47.97	Pierre Fairbank; France	48.91 SB
T54	Yassine Gharbi; Tunisia	45.57 CR	Kenny van Weeghel; Netherlands	46.55	Richard Chiassaro; Great Britain	46.56
WR world record | AR area record | CR championship record | GR games record | NR national record | OR Olympic record | PB personal best | SB season best | WL world leading (in a given season)

Events listed in pink were contested but no medals were awarded.

== See also ==
- List of IPC world records in athletics
