= 2021 World Para Athletics European Championships – Women's 400 metres =

The women's 400 metres events were held on each day of the 2021 World Para Athletics European Championships in Bydgoszcz, Poland.

== Medalists ==
Event	Gold		Silver		Bronze	
T11	Joanna Mazur (POL); Guide: Michal Stawicki	1:03.90	Öznur Akbulut (TUR); Guide: Ahmet Hakan Akbulut	1:09.09	Havva Elmalı (TUR); Guide: Hasan Deniz Kalayci	1:11.72 PB
T12	Sevda Kılınç Çırakoğlu (TUR); Guide: Okan Yilmaz	1:00.03	Melani Bergés Gámez (ESP); Guide: Jaime del Rio Ruiz	1:02.16	Iida Lounela (FIN)	1:07.01 PB
T13	Adiaratou Iglesias Forneiro (ESP)	55.70 ER	Leilia Adzhametova (UKR)	56.92	Nantenin Keïta (FRA)	57.50 SB
T20	Yuliia Shuliar (UKR)	56.83 ER	Carina Paim (POR)	58.73	Justyna Franieczek (POL)	59.09 PB
T37	Nataliia Kobzar (UKR)	1:03.78	Elena Tretiakova (RUS)	1:07.37	Viktoriia Slanova (RUS)	1:07.89
T38	Luca Ekler (HUN)	1:00.27 WR	Margarita Goncharova (RUS)	1:00.79 PB	Ali Smith (GBR)	1:03.91 PB
T47	Anastasiia Soloveva (RUS)	1:00.04	Katarzyna Kisiel (POL)	1:03.07	Agata Galan (POL)	1:04.88
T53	Catherine Debrunner (SUI)	55.71 CR	Hamide Doğangün (TUR)	56.46 SB	Zeynep Acet (TUR)	1:06.71 SB
T54	Merle Menje (GER)	57.53	Zübeyde Süpürgeci (TUR)	58.80 SB	Alexandra Helbling (SUI)	59.30
WR world record | ER European record | CR championship record | NR national record | WL world leading | EL European leading | PB personal best | SB seasonal best

== See also ==
- List of IPC world records in athletics
