= 2015 IPC Athletics World Championships – Women's 4 × 100 metres relay =

The women's 4x100 metres relay at the 2015 IPC Athletics World Championships was held at the Suheim Bin Hamad Stadium in Doha from 22–31 October.

== Medalists ==
| Event | Gold | | Silver | | Bronze | |
|---|---|---|---|---|---|---|
| T11-13 | Zhou Guohua (T12); Guide: Jia Dengpu; Jia Juntingxian (T11); Guide: Shi Yang; Wang Yuqin (T12); Guide: Hu Peng; Liu Cuiqing (T11); Guide: Xu Donglin; China | 48.58 CR | Elena Pautova (T12); Guide: Vladimir Miasnikov; Anna Sorokina (T12); Arina Baranova (T13); Alina Samigulina (T11); Guide: Anatolii Bystrov; Russia | 50.88 | Lia Beel Quintana (T11); Guide: David Alonso Gutierrz; Sara Martinez (T12); Melani Berges Gamez (T12); Sara Fernandez Roldan (T12); Spain | 53.64 |
| T35-38 | Olivia Breen (T38); Maria Lyle (T35); Georgina Hermitage (T37); Sophie Hahn (T38); Great Britain | 52.22 WR | Elena Sviridova (T36); Svetlana Sergeeva (T37); Anna Sapozhnikova (T37); Margarita Goncharova (T38); Russia | 53.18 NR | Li Yingli (T37); Cao Yuanhang (T37); Liu Ping (T35); Chen Junfei (T38); China | 57.61 NR |
WR world record | AR area record | CR championship record | GR games record | NR national record | OR Olympic record | PB personal best | SB season best | WL world leading (in a given season)

== See also ==
- List of IPC world records in athletics
