= Leo-Pekka Tähti =

Finnish Paralympic athlete (born 1983)

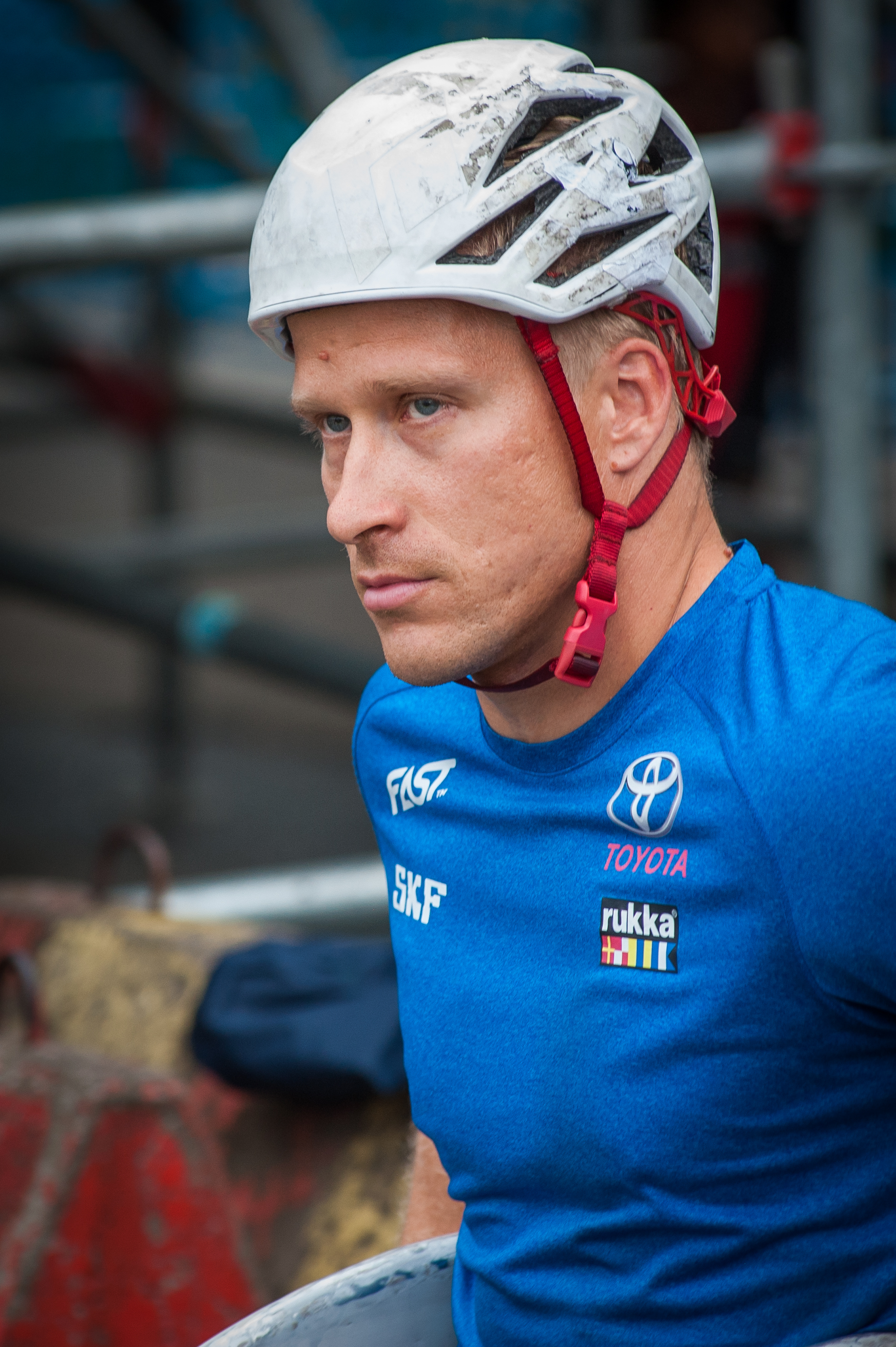
- Leo-Pekka Tähti in 2018

Personal information
- Born: 22 June 1983 (age 43) Pori, Finland

Sport
- Country: Finland
- Sport: Track and field
- Disability class: T54
- Event: sprints
- Club: Porin Tarmo: Finland
- Team: Finland
- Coached by: Juha Flinck (national)
Medal record
Men's Paralympic athletics
Representing Finland
Event	1st	2nd	3rd
Paralympic Games	5	1	2
World Championships	5	4	3
European Championships	10	3	1
Total	20	8	6
Paralympic Games
Gold medal – first place	2004 Athens	100 m T54
Gold medal – first place	2004 Athens	200 m T54
Gold medal – first place	2008 Beijing	100 m T54
Gold medal – first place	2012 London	100 m T54
Gold medal – first place	2016 Rio de Janeiro	100 m T54
Silver medal – second place	2020 Tokyo	100 m T54
Bronze medal – third place	2008 Beijing	200 m T54
Bronze medal – third place	2024 Paris	100 m T54
World Championships
Gold medal – first place	2011 Christchurch	100 m T54
Gold medal – first place	2013 Lyon	100 m T54
Gold medal – first place	2017 London	100 m T54
Gold medal – first place	2019 Dubai	100 m T54
Gold medal – first place	2024 Kobe	100 m T54
Silver medal – second place	2011 Christchurch	200 m T54
Silver medal – second place	2013 Lyon	200 m T54
Silver medal – second place	2015 Doha	100 m T54
Silver medal – second place	2023 Paris	100 m T54
Bronze medal – third place	2006 Assen	100 m T54
Bronze medal – third place	2006 Assen	200 m T54
Bronze medal – third place	2017 London	200 m T54
European Championships
Gold medal – first place	2005 Espoo	100 m T54
Gold medal – first place	2005 Espoo	200 m T54
Gold medal – first place	2012 Stadskanaal	100 m T54
Gold medal – first place	2014 Swansea	100 m T54
Gold medal – first place	2016 Grosseto	100 m T54
Gold medal – first place	2018 Berlin	100 m T54
Gold medal – first place	2018 Berlin	200 m T54
Gold medal – first place	2018 Berlin	400 m T54
Gold medal – first place	2021 Bydgoszcz	100 m T54
Gold medal – first place	2021 Bydgoszcz	400 m T54
Silver medal – second place	2012 Stadskanaal	400 m T54
Silver medal – second place	2014 Swansea	400 m T54
Silver medal – second place	2018 Berlin	800 m T54
Bronze medal – third place	2016 Grosseto	200 m T54

Leo-Pekka Tähti (born 22 June 1983 in Pori, Finland) is a Finnish athlete and Paralympian competing mainly in category T54 sprint events.

== Career ==
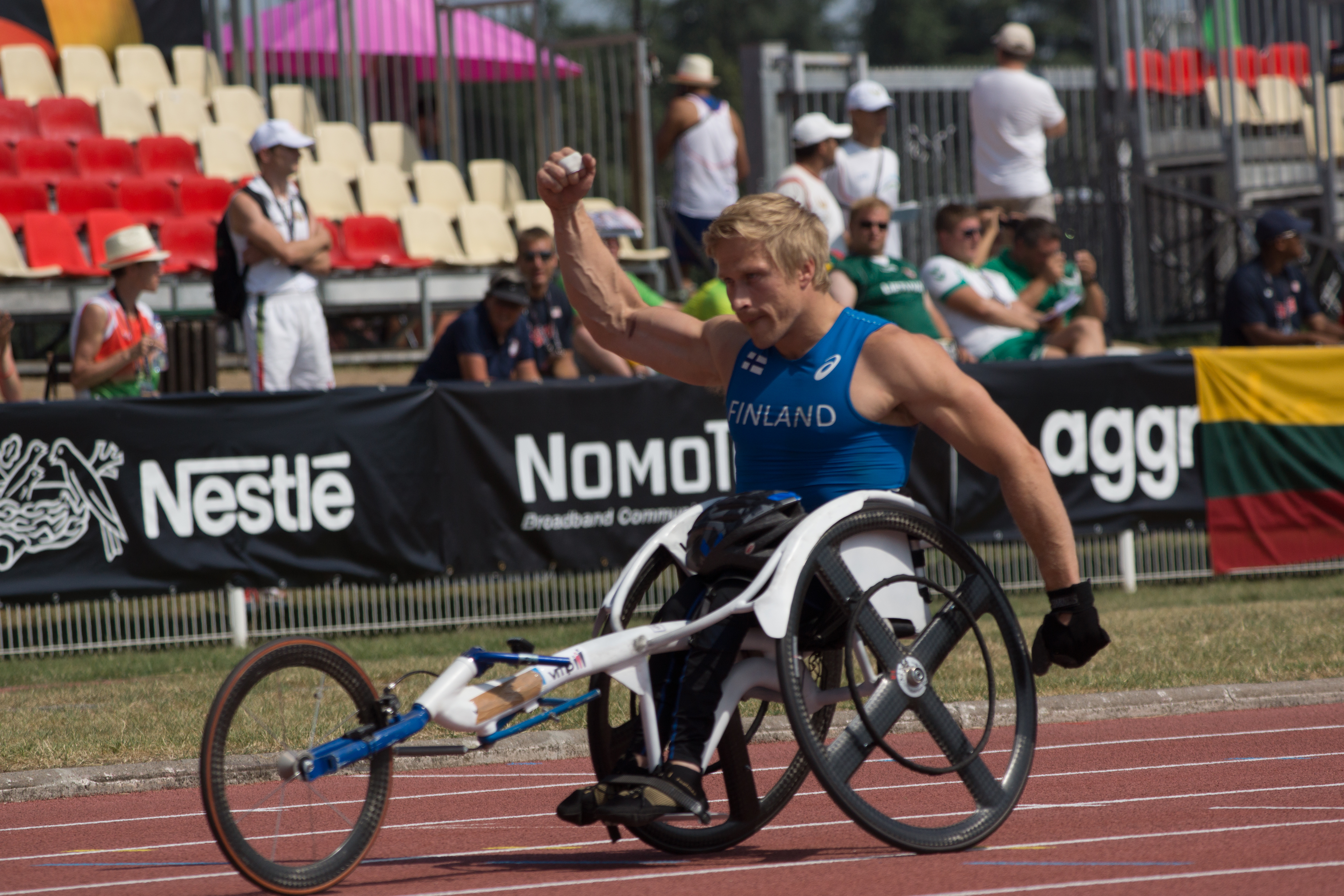
Tähti at the 2013 IPC Athletics World Championships

He won the gold medal in the 100m and 200m events at the 2004 Summer Paralympics in Athens, Greece. He also competed in the 2008 Summer Paralympics in Beijing, China, winning a gold medal in the men's 100 metres – T54 event and a bronze medal in the men's 200 metres – T54 event. At the 2012 Paralympics in London, United Kingdom, he won the gold medal in the 100 metre T54 event after recording a new world record 13.63 in the qualifying round. He won a gold medal in the 100 metres T54 event at the 2016 Summer Paralympics. He won a silver medal in the 100 metres T54 event at the 2020 Summer Paralympics.
