= 2016 IPC Athletics European Championships – Men's 200 metres =

The men's 200 metres at the 2016 IPC Athletics European Championships was held at the Stadio Olimpico Carlo Zecchini in Grosseto from 11–16 June.

== Medalists ==
Event	Gold		Silver		Bronze	
T11	Timothee Adolphe; Gautier Simounet (guide); France	23.19 CR	Mehmet Tunc; Arda Eris (guide); Turkey	23.65 PB	Firmino Baptista; Joao Barros (guide); Portugal	25.69
T12	Artem Loginov; Russia	22.37 CR	Thomas Ulbricht; Germany	22.61 SB	Joan Munar Martinez; Spain	22.82
T13	Mateusz Michalski; Poland	22.07 SB	Andrei Kuzmin; Russia	22.28 PB	Aleksei Labzin; Russia	22.48
T34	Henry Manni; Finland	28.33 CR	Sebastien Mobre; France	29.11 SB	Isaac Towers; Great Britain	29.71
T35	Dmitrii Safronov; Russia	26.06	Artem Kalashian; Russia	26.47	Jordan Howe; Great Britain	28.27
T36	Evgenii Torsunov; Russia	25.54	Graeme Ballard; Great Britain	26.14	—	
T38	Chermen Kobesov; Russia	23.30	Andrei Vdovin; Russia	24.32	Lorenzo Albaladejo Martinez; Spain	24.36
T42	Richard Whitehead; Great Britain	25.09	David Henson; Great Britain	25.89	Anton Prokhorov; Russia	26.16
T44	Johannes Floors (T43); Germany	21.82 ER	Felix Streng; Germany	22.04 ER	Michail Seitis; Greece	22.58 PB
T47	Aleksei Kotlov; Russia	22.15 CR	Gunther Matzinger; Austria	22.60 PB	Vadim Trunov; Russia	22.83 SB
T53	Moatez Jomni; Great Britain	26.64 CR	Vitalii Gritsenko; Russia	26.72	Arsen Kurbanov; Russia	28.22 PB
T54	Richard Chiassaro; Great Britain	25.14 CR	Aleksei Bychenok; Russia	25.29	Leo-Pekka Tähti; Finland	25.45 SB
WR world record | AR area record | CR championship record | GR games record | NR national record | OR Olympic record | PB personal best | SB season best | WL world leading (in a given season)

== See also ==
- List of IPC world records in athletics
