= 2018 World Para Athletics European Championships – Universal 4 × 100 metres relay =

The universal 4 × 100 metres relay at the 2018 World Para Athletics European Championships will be held at the Friedrich-Ludwig-Jahnsportpark in Berlin from 20 to 26 August. 1 event will be held over this distance. This is the sole mixed gender event at the Championships (excepting guides in T11 events).

== Medalists ==
Event	Gold		Silver		Bronze	
Universal relay	Great Britain (GBR); Sophie Hahn; Nathan Maguire; Laura Sugar; Zac Skinner; Dillon Labrooy; Zachary Shaw	48.73	France (FRA); Tomothee Adolphe guide: Jeffrey Lami; Julien Casoli; Mandy Francois-Elie; Angelina Lanza	49.40	Italy (ITA); Riccardo Bagaini; Carlotta Bertoli; Oxana Corso; Diego Gastaldi	54.39
WR world record | AR area record | CR championship record | GR games record | NR national record | OR Olympic record | PB personal best | SB season best | WL world leading (in a given season)

== See also ==
- List of IPC world records in athletics
