= Daniel Pek =

Polish Paralympic athlete (born 1991)

Personal information
- Nationality: Polish
- Born: 28 November 1991 (age 34) Kościerzyna, Poland

Sport
- Country: Poland
- Sport: Track and field
- Disability class: (T20)
- Event: middle-distance running
- Club: UKS Olympijczyk Skorzewo
- Coached by: Leszek Zblewski (club); Zbigniew Lewkowicz (national)
Medal record
Paralympic athletics
Representing Poland
Paralympic Games
Silver medal – second place	2012 London	1500 m – F20
IPC World Championships
Silver medal – second place	2013 Lyon	1500m – T20
IPC European Championships
Gold medal – first place	2016 Grosseto	Men's 1500m – T20
Bronze medal – third place	2016 Grosseto	Men's 800m – T20

Daniel Pek (born 28 November 1991) is a Paralympic athlete from Poland who competes in T20 classification middle-distance running events. Pek represented Poland at the 2012 Summer Paralympics in London, where he won silver in the 1500 m race. He has also finished on the podium at both World and European Championships, winning the gold medal at the 2016 European Championship in Grosseto in his favoured 1,500m event.
