= 2016 IPC Athletics European Championships – Women's 400 metres =

The women's 400 metres at the 2016 IPC Athletics European Championships was held at the Stadio Olimpico Carlo Zecchini in Grosseto from 11–16 June.

== Medalists ==
Event	Gold		Silver		Bronze	
T12	Melany Bergés Gámez; Sergio Sanchez Palancar (guide); Spain	58.09 PB	Izaskun Osés Ayúcar; Spain	58.30	Öznur Alumur; Ahmet Tas (guide); Turkey	1:04.40 SB
T13	Nantenin Keïta; France	56.30 CR	Arina Baranova; Russia	58.79 PB	Carolina Duarte; Portugal	58.16 PB
T20	Barbara Niewiedzial; Poland	57.98 CR	Sabina Stenka; Poland	59.52 SB	Piroska Csontos; Hungary	1:00.52 SB
T34	Veronika Doronina; Russia	1:08.70 PB	Carly Tait; Great Britain	1:08.74	—	
T38	Georgina Hermitage (T37); Great Britain	1:00.63 WR	Margarita Goncharova; Russia	1:02.12 WR	Evgeniya Trushnikova (T37); Russia	1:06.21
T44	Marie-Amelie le Fur; France	59.34 CR	Irmgard Bensusan; Germany	1:02.71	Giuseppina Versace (T43); Italy	1:05.31
T53	Hamide Kurt; Turkey	56.45 CR	Akzhana Abdikarimova; Russia	57.66 PB	—	
T54	Natalia Kocherova; Russia	55.83 CR	Gunilla Wallengren; Sweden	57.35 SB	Alexandra Helbling; Switzerland	58.10 SB
WR world record | AR area record | CR championship record | GR games record | NR national record | OR Olympic record | PB personal best | SB season best | WL world leading (in a given season)

== See also ==
- List of IPC world records in athletics
