= 2016 IPC Athletics European Championships – Men's 1500 metres =

The men's 1,500 metres at the 2016 IPC Athletics European Championships was held at the Stadio Olimpico Carlo Zecchini in Grosseto from 11–16 June.

== Medalists ==
Event	Gold		Silver		Bronze	
T11	Semih Deniz; Muhammed Emin Tan (guide); Turkey	4:11.97 CR	Hasan Huseyin Kacar; Erdi Aksu (guide); Turkey	4:14.13 PB	Aleksander Kossakowski; Sylwester Lepiarz (guide); Poland	4:22.66
T13	Lukasz Wietecki; Poland	3:57.38 CR	David Devine (T12); Great Britain	3:58.42	Aleksandr Kostin; Poland	4:00.36 PB
T20	Daniel Pek; Poland	3:56.28 ER	Alexander Rabotnitskiy; Russia	3:56.72 PB	Rafal Korc; Poland	3:56.78 SB
T38	Louis Radius; France	4:20.01 CR	Christoffer Schultz Vienberg; Denmark	4:26.27 PB	Leonid Varfolomeev; Russia	4:31.37 SB
T46	Aleksandr Iaremchuk; Russia	4:02.69 CR	Hristiyan Stoyanov; Bulgaria	4:03.63 PB	Bayram Yilmaz; Russia	4:12.63
T52	Thomas Geierspichler; Austria	4:06.13 CR	—		—	
T54	David Weir; Great Britain	3:18.50	Aleksei Bychenok; Russia	3:18.53	Alhassane Balde; Germany	3:19.34
WR world record | AR area record | CR championship record | GR games record | NR national record | OR Olympic record | PB personal best | SB season best | WL world leading (in a given season)

== See also ==
- List of IPC world records in athletics
