= Carly Tait =

British wheelchair athlete

Personal information
- Born: 2 January 1986 (age 40)

Sport
- Country: Great Britain
- Sport: Wheelchair racing
- Disability class: T34
- Event(s): 400 m & 800 m
- Club: Stockport Harriers
- Coached by: Rick Hoskins (club); Paula Dunn (national)
Medal record
Representing Great Britain
Women's athletics
IPC European Championships
Silver medal – second place	2016 Grosseto	100 m T34
Silver medal – second place	2016 Grosseto	400 m T34

Carly Tait (born 2 January 1986) is a British wheelchair athlete specialising in sprint and middle-distance events in the T34 classification.

== Early years ==
Tait, who has cerebral palsy, was born in 1986 - daughter of Andrew Tait and Victoria Tait. She was educated at Ashton-on-Mersey high school before attending South Trafford College. She matriculated to the University of Central Lancashire where she achieved a degree in marketing, communications and advertising.

== Athletics career ==
Tait took up wheelchair racing in 2012, after being inspired by the Summer Paralympics in London. She first tried out disability athletics sport in November 2012, and after becoming classified as a T34 athlete she began competing at national meets in 2013. Tait took part in her first IPC Grand Prix meet in 2014, competing in Nottwil in Switzerland. In the buildup to the 2016 Summer Paralympics, she was selected to represent Great Britain at the 2016 IPC Athletics European Championships in Grosseto. Several of Tait's team-mates failed to make the trip to Italy, including world number one Hannah Cockroft, leaving the field open. Tait won silver at two distances, the 100 m and 400 m events. She also won the 800 m middle-distance event, but the race was declared a non-medal event due to a lack of competitors.

When the initial list of British track and field athletes for the Summer Paralympics was announced on 27 July 2016 Tait was not among their number. Two days later Tait and shot putter Beverley Jones were added to the squad after two additional slots were made available to the Great Britain team.
