= Ben Rowlings =

British Paralympic athlete

Personal information
- Nationality: British
- Born: 2 May 1996 (age 30) Shrewsbury, England
- Home town: Newport, Shropshire, England

Sport
- Country: Great Britain
- Sport: Track and field
- Disability class: T34
- Club: Coventry Godiva Harriers/Red Star AC
- Coached by: Ian Mirfin (club); Paula Dunn (national)
Medal record
Men's athletics
Representing Great Britain
IPC Athletics World Championships
| Silver medal – second place | 2018 Berlin | 800m - T34 |
| Silver medal – second place | 2018 Berlin | 400m - T34 |
IPC Athletics European Championships
| Bronze medal – third place | 2014 Swansea | 800m - T34 |
| Bronze medal – third place | 2016 Grosseto | 100m - T34 |
| Bronze medal – third place | 2016 Grosseto | 400m - T34 |
| Bronze medal – third place | 2016 Grosseto | 800m - T34 |

Ben Rowlings (born 2 May 1996) is a British Paralympic athlete who competes in sprint and middle-distance events in the T34 classification.

== Personal history ==
Rowlings was born in Shrewsbury, England in 1996. He was delivered with the umbilical cord wrapped around his neck causing oxygen starvation, which resulted in Rowlings developing cerebral palsy.

== Athletics career ==
Rowlings first became involved in competitive sport as a teenager when he took up swimming. He competed at national level but switched to wheelchair racing at the age of 15 after he went to a British Athletics talent identification day. After gaining his classification in 2011 as a T34 athlete, Rowlings began competing at national meets. By 2013 Rowlings was appearing at senior meets and entered his first IPC Grand Prix. The next year he represented Great Britain at his first major international event, the 2014 IPC Athletics European Championships in Swansea. There, he entered three events, taking the bronze medal in the 800m T34 in a time of 1:56.11.

In 2015 Rowlings was selected to again represent Great Britain, this time at the IPC World Championships in Doha. Although he failed to take any medals, he came fourth in both the 400 metres and 800 metres races. 2015 also saw Rowlings set four British records in the same meet, when he broke the 100m, 200, 400, and 800m records at the IPC Grand Prix in Nottwil, Switzerland. The following year, in the build-up to the Summer Paralympics in Rio, Rowlings attended the 2016 European Championships in Grosseto. He medaled in all three events, improving on all his times from Swansea two years ago. He won the bronze medal in the 100m, 400m and 800m T34. In July Rowlings was named as part of the Great Britain team that would be travelling to Rio to compete in the Summer Paralympics.

Rowlings competed in athletics at the 2020 Summer Paralympics.
