= Sara Fernández Roldán =

Spanish Paralympic athlete (born 1994)

Personal information
- Born: 5 December 1994 (age 31) Seville, Spain

Sport
- Country: Spain
- Sport: Paralympic athletics
- Disability: Albinism
- Disability class: T12
- Event(s): 100 metres Long jump
- Club: ADM of Athletics, Tomares
- Coached by: Laura Real Cobo
Medal record
Paralympic athletics
Representing Spain
World Championships
Bronze medal – third place	2015 Dubai	4x100m relay T11-13
European Championships
Bronze medal – third place	2014 Swansea	Long jump T12
Bronze medal – third place	2016 Grosseto	100m T12

Sara Fernández Roldán (born 5 December 1994) is a Spanish Paralympic athlete who competes in international track and field competitions, she competes in sprint and long jump. She is a World bronze medalist and a two-time European bronze medalist.
