= Sophie Hahn =

English Paralympic athlete

Sophie Hahn MBE
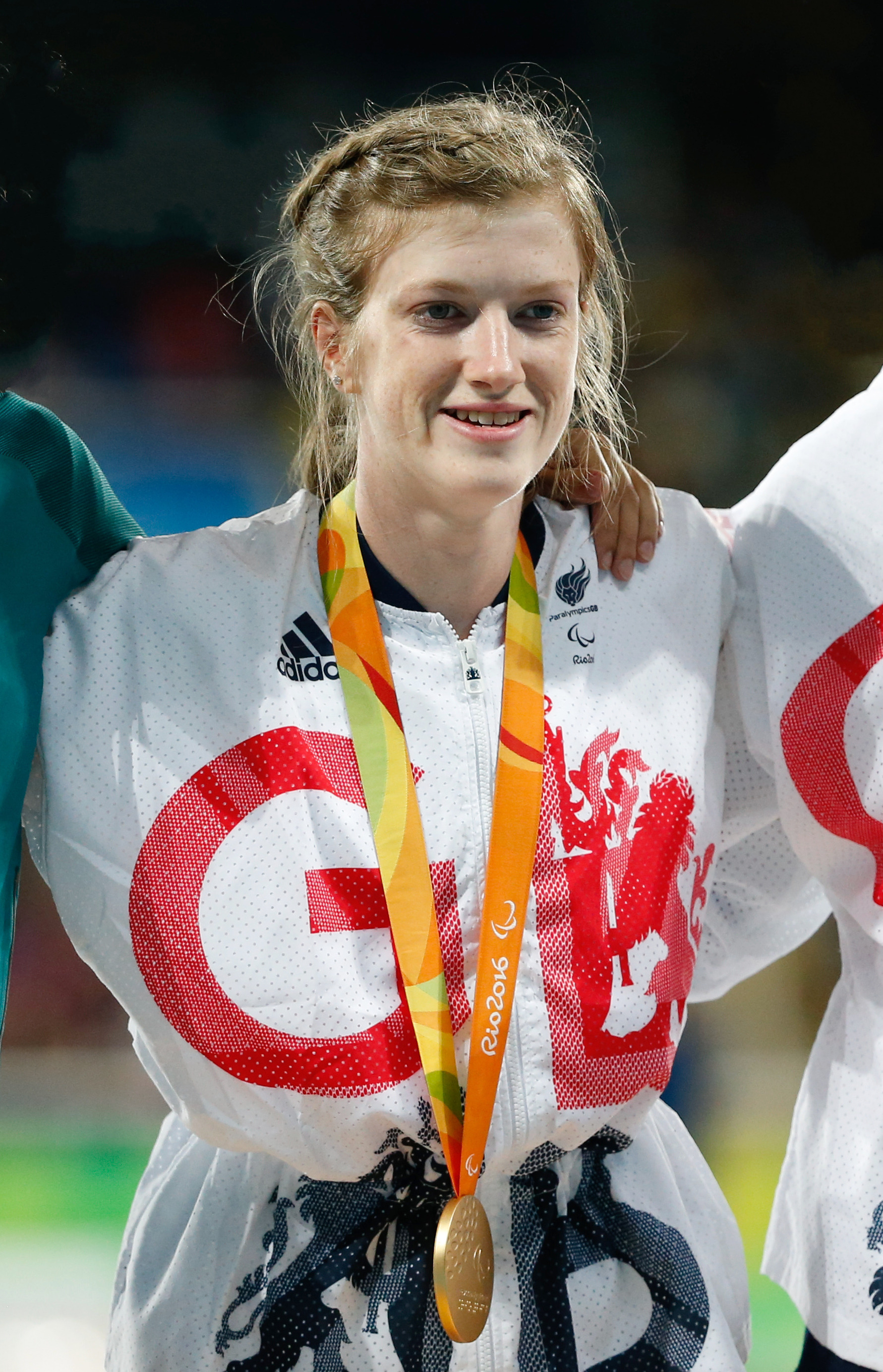
- Hahn at the 2016 Paralympics

Personal information
- Nationality: United Kingdom
- Born: Sophie Megan Hahn; 23 January 1997 (age 29)
- Height: 157 cm (5 ft 2 in) (2022)
- Weight: 47 kg (104 lb) (2022)

Sport
- Country: Great Britain
- Sport: Athletics
- Event: T38 sprint
- Coached by: Leon Baptiste

Achievements and titles
- Highest world ranking: 1st – 100m (T38)
- Personal bests: 100m sprint: 12.38s 200m sprint: 25.92s
Medal record
Women's para athletics
Representing Great Britain
Summer Paralympics
Gold medal – first place	2016 Rio de Janeiro	100m – T38
Gold medal – first place	2020 Tokyo	100m – T38
Silver medal – second place	2016 Rio de Janeiro	4 × 100m relay – T35-38
World Championships
Gold medal – first place	2013 Lyon	100m – T38
Gold medal – first place	2015 Doha	100m – T38
Gold medal – first place	2015 Doha	4 × 100m relay – T35-38
Gold medal – first place	2017 London	100m – T38
Gold medal – first place	2017 London	200m – T38
Gold medal – first place	2019 Dubai	100m – T38
Gold medal – first place	2019 Dubai	200m – T38
Silver medal – second place	2013 Lyon	200m – T38
Silver medal – second place	2015 Doha	200m – T38
Bronze medal – third place	2023 Paris	100m – T38
Bronze medal – third place	2023 Paris	200m – T38
European Championships
Gold medal – first place	2016 Grosseto	100m – T38
Gold medal – first place	2016 Grosseto	4 × 100m relay – T35-38
Gold medal – first place	2018 Berlin	100m – T38
Gold medal – first place	2018 Berlin	200m – T38
Gold medal – first place	2018 Berlin	4 x 100 m relay Universal
Silver medal – second place	2014 Swansea	100m – T38
Silver medal – second place	2014 Swansea	400m – T38
Silver medal – second place	2014 Swansea	4 × 100m relay – T35-38
Silver medal – second place	2016 Grosseto	200m – T38
Representing England
Commonwealth Games
Gold medal – first place	2018 Gold Coast	100m – T38
Silver medal – second place	2022 Birmingham	100m – T38
Gold medal – first place	2026 Glasgow	100m – T38

Sophie Megan Hahn (born 23 January 1997) is a parasport athlete from England competing mainly in T38 sprint events. In 2013, she qualified for the 2013 IPC Athletics World Championships, selected for the T38 100m and 200m. She took the gold in the 100m sprint, setting a new world record.

In 2018, she won the gold medal in the T38 100 metres for women at the Commonwealth Games; in doing so she became the first female track and field athlete to hold gold medals in the same event from the World Championships, Paralympic Games, European Championships and Commonwealth Games, mirroring in parasports the achievements of fellow Paralympian Dan Greaves, and Olympic champions Daley Thompson, Linford Christie, Sally Gunnell, Jonathan Edwards and Greg Rutherford.

== Career history ==
Hahn, who has cerebral palsy, came into athletics at the age of 15. Enthused by the 2012 Summer Paralympics in London, her older brother, knowing of her pace as a runner encouraged her to seek an athletics club. Her mother got in touch with her nearest club and Hahn was called in for trials and accepted by coach Joseph McDonnell. Her first competitive races occurred in 2013, and in the Charnwood Athletics warm up she took the 100m and 200m races. After entering several tournaments in June, she broke onto the British sprinting scene by taking first place at the England Athletics Senior Disability Championships, winning both 100m (13.27s) and 200m (27.88s).

Selected for the IPC World Championships in Lyon in the T38, Hahn was entered in both the 100m and 200m in the T38 classification. On 21 July, she won her qualifying heat of the 200m with a time of 27.56. In the final she was beaten by Brazil's Verônica Hipólito, but held on to take the silver medal. On 23 July she qualified for the 100m sprint, this time coming in second. The next day, in the final, Hahn ran a world record time of 13.10s, beating Hipolito into second place.

At the 2016 Paralympics in Rio de Janeiro, she won a gold medal in the 100 metres.

Hahn won gold in the 100 metres at the 2018 Commonwealth Games on the Gold Coast in Australia. Also in 2018, Hahn had her impairment classification questioned by the father of a rival, Olivia Breen. At a Parliamentary select committee, Michael Breen claimed Hahn had been misclassified and was getting an unfair advantage.

At the 2019 World Para Athletics Championships in Dubai, she claimed gold and set new world records in both the 100 metres and 200 metres.

In June 2021, Hahn was among the first dozen athletes chosen for the UK athletics team at the delayed 2020 Paralympics in Tokyo where she won gold in the 100 metres.

At the 2022 Commonwealth Games in Birmingham, Hahn won a silver medal in the 100 metres. While a year later at the 2023 World Para Athletics Championships in Paris, she took bronze in both the 100 metres and 200 metres.

At the 2024 Summer Paralympics Sophie came 6th in the T38 100 metres.
