= Yegorovka =

Yegorovka Егоровка
- Village
- Location within Bashkortostan Location within Russia
- Coordinates: 53°44′N 54°21′E
- Country: Russia
- Region: Bashkortostan
- District: Bizhbulyaksky District
- Time zone: UTC+5:00

Yegorovka (Russian: Егоровка) is a rural locality (a village) in Bazlyksky Selsoviet, Bizhbulyaksky District, Bashkortostan, Russia. The population was 64 as of 2010. There is 1 street.

== Geography ==
Yegorovka is located 14 km northeast of Bizhbulyak (the district's administrative centre) by road. Musino is the nearest rural locality.
