= Hamide Doğangün =

Turkish Paralympic athlete

Personal information
- Born: Hamide Kurt; 25 December 1993 (age 32) Istanbul, Turkey

Sport
- Country: Turkey
- Sport: Athletics
- Disability class: T53
- Team: Red Velvet Racing Team
- Coached by: Arno Mul
Medal record
Track and field
Representing Turkey
World Championships
Silver medal – second place	2015 Doha	100m T53
Silver medal – second place	2025 New Delhi	100m T53
Silver medal – second place	2025 New Delhi	400m T53
Bronze medal – third place	2017 London	200m T53
Bronze medal – third place	2019 Dubai	400m T53
Bronze medal – third place	2023 Paris	800m T53
Bronze medal – third place	2024 Kobe	100m T53
Bronze medal – third place	2024 Kobe	400m T53
Bronze medal – third place	2024 Kobe	800m T53
Bronze medal – third place	2025 New Delhi	800m T53
European Championships
Gold medal – first place	2012 Stadskanaal	200m T34/52/53
Gold medal – first place	2016 Grosseto	100m T53
Gold medal – first place	2016 Grosseto	400m T53
Gold medal – first place	2018 Berlin	200m T53
Silver medal – second place	2014 Swansea	100m T53
Silver medal – second place	2014 Swansea	400m T53
Silver medal – second place	2014 Swansea	800m T53
Silver medal – second place	2021 Bydgoszcz	100m T53
Silver medal – second place	2021 Bydgoszcz	400m T53
Silver medal – second place	2021 Bydgoszcz	800m T53
Bronze medal – third place	2016 Grosseto	800m T54

Hamide Kurt Doğangün (born Hamide Kurt, 25 December 1993) is a Turkish Paralympian athlete competing in the T53 disability class sprint events of 100m and 400m, T52/T53 class middle-distance event of 800m as well as T53/T54 class 4 × 400 m relay event.

== Early years ==
Doğangün was born in Istanbul, Turkey on 25 December 1993. At the age of nine, she had a traffic accident in Istanbul. After nearly two years of treatment in a hospital, she lost the ability to walk, and became reliant on a wheelchair.

== Sporting career ==
Doğangün began her sporting career in wheelchair basketball at Bağcılar Belediye SK in Istanbul. After realizing that she is not good in this sport branch, she switched over to the para-athletics in the same club.

In 2008, she took part at the Turkish Para-athletics Championships, and her success led to her admission to the national team.

Doğangün captured the gold medal in the 200m T34/52/53 event at the 2012 IPC Athletics European Championships held in Stadskanaal, Netherlands.

She won the silver medal in the 100m T53 event at the 2015 IPC Athletics World Championships in Doha, Qatar. She set an area record with her time of 17.10 seconds.

At the 8th FAZAA leg of the IPC Athletics 2016 Grand Prix in Dubai, United Arab Emirates, which was a 2016 Paralympics qualifier, she won the silver medal in the 100m T53 event with 17.43.

Doğangün represented her country at the 2016 Paralympics in Rio de Janeiro, Brazil. She finished the 400m T53 event sixth. She became European champion in the 200m T53 event at the 2018 IPC Athletics European Championships in Berlin, Germany running in 31.59.

She won the bronze medal at the 2019 World Para Athletics Championships – Women's 400 metres event in Dubai, United Arab Emirates. She qualified for the 2020 Summer Paralympics. She took the silver medal in the 100m T53 event of the 2021 World Para Athletics European Championships in Bydgoszcz, Poland. She won further the silver medal in the 400m T53 event in the same championship. She won her third silver medal in the 800m T53 event.
