= Richard Chiassaro =

British Paralympic athlete

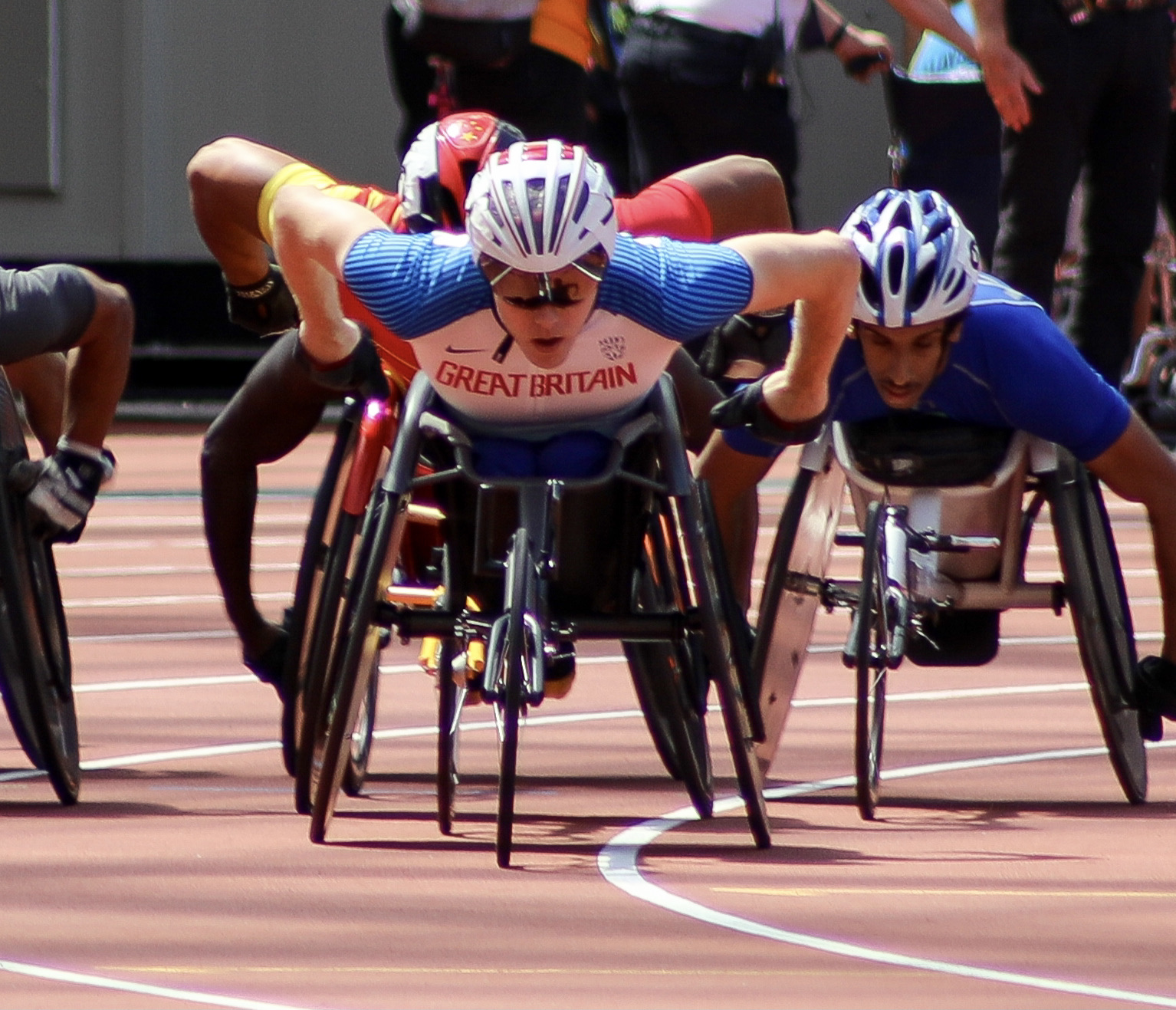
- Chiassaro at the IPC London games 2017

Personal information
- Born: 11 November 1981 (age 44) England

Sport
- Country: United Kingdom
- Sport: Track and field
- Disability class: T54
- Event(s): 100m, 200m, 400m, 800m
- Club: Harlow Athletics Club
- Team: Great Britain
- Coached by: Jenni Banks (club); Paula Dunn (national)

Achievements and titles
- Paralympic finals: 2016 Rio de Janeiro
Medal record
Men's Paralympic athletics
Representing Great Britain
World Championships
Bronze medal – third place	2017 London	400 m T54
European Championships
Gold medal – first place	2016 Grosseto	200 m T54
Silver medal – second place	2016 Grosseto	100 m T54
Silver medal – second place	2016 Grosseto	400 m T54
Silver medal – second place	2016 Grosseto	800 m T54

Richard Chiassaro (born 11 November 1981) is a British Paralympic athlete who competes mainly in category T54 sprint events and middle-distance events.

== Early life ==
Chiassaro was born in England in 1981. Chiassaro was born with spina bifida.
