= Mário Trindade =

Portuguese Paralympic sprinter

Personal information
- Born: 25 May 1975 (age 51) Vila Real, Portugal
- Height: 1.93 m (6 ft 4 in)
- Weight: 43 kg (95 lb)

Sport
- Country: Portugal
- Sport: Paralympic athletics
- Disability: Scoliosis
- Disability class: T52
Medal record
Paralympic athletics
Representing Portugal
European Championships
Gold medal – first place	2018 Berlin	100m T52
Silver medal – second place	2016 Grosseto	100m T52
Silver medal – second place	2018 Berlin	400m T52
Bronze medal – third place	2014 Swansea	100m T52
Bronze medal – third place	2016 Grosseto	400m T52
Bronze medal – third place	2021 Bydgoszcz	100m T52

Mário Trindade (born 25 May 1975) is a Portuguese Paralympic athlete who competes in 100 metres and 400 metres events. He is a European champion and he has competed at the 2016 Summer Paralympics. Trindade is also a Guinness World Records holder for completing the greatest distance covered by a wheelchair in 24 hours, he travelled 183.4 km at the Vila Real Stadium in his hometown.
