= Janne Sophie Engeleiter =

German Paralympic athlete

Personal information
- Born: 18 August 1995 (age 30) Rathenow, Germany

Sport
- Country: Germany
- Sport: Paralympic athletics
- Disability class: T13
- Event(s): 100 metres 200 metres Long jump
- Club: BPRSV Cottbus
- Coached by: Ralf Paulo
Medal record
Paralympic athletics
Representing Germany
European Championships
Silver medal – second place	2012 Stadskanaal	100m T13
Silver medal – second place	2014 Swansea	100m T13
Bronze medal – third place	2012 Stadskanaal	Long jump F13
Bronze medal – third place	2016 Grosseto	100m T13
Bronze medal – third place	2016 Grosseto	200m T13
Bronze medal – third place	2021 Bydgoszcz	100m T13

Janne Sophie Engeleiter was born on 18 August 1995, in Rathenow, Germany. She is a German Paralympic athlete, who competes in sprinting and long jump events at international elite events. She is also a multiple European medalist in 100 metres.
