= Georgina Hermitage =

British Paralympic athlete

Georgina Hermitage MBE
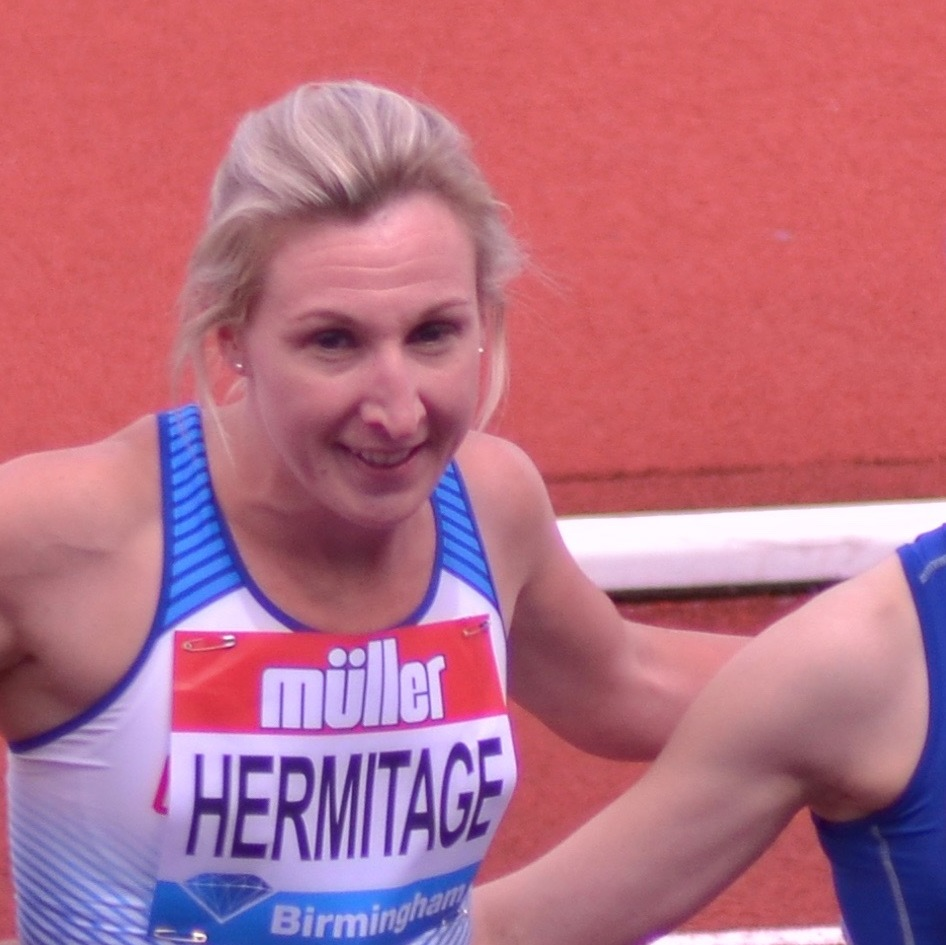

Personal information
- Nationality: Great Britain
- Born: 28 March 1989 (age 37) Guildford, England

Sport
- Country: Great Britain
- Sport: Athletics
- Event(s): T37 sprint, middle distance
- Club: Guildford & Godalming AC
- Turned pro: 2014
- Coached by: Paula Dunn (national); Paul MacGregor (club)

Achievements and titles
- Highest world ranking: 1st – 400m (T37)
- Personal best(s): 100m: 13.13s 200m: 27.21s 400m: 1:00.29
Medal record
Women's para-athletics
Representing Great Britain
Paralympic Games
Gold medal – first place	2016 Rio	100m – T37
Gold medal – first place	2016 Rio	400m – T37
Silver medal – second place	2016 Rio	4 × 100 m – T35-38
World Championships
Gold medal – first place	2015 Doha	400m – T37
Gold medal – first place	2015 Doha	4x100m relay – T35-38
Gold medal – first place	2017 London	100m – T37
Gold medal – first place	2017 London	400m – T37
Silver medal – second place	2015 Doha	100m – T37
European Championships
Gold medal – first place	2016 Grosseto	100m – T37
Gold medal – first place	2016 Grosseto	200m – T37
Gold medal – first place	2016 Grosseto	400m – T38
Gold medal – first place	2016 Grosseto	100m – T35-38

Georgina Hermitage (born 28 March 1989) is a British former parasport athlete competing in T37 sprint events. In 2015, she qualified for the 2015 IPC Athletics World Championships in Doha, selected for the T37 100m and 200m. She took the gold in the 400m sprint, setting a new world record.

== Personal history ==
Hermitage was born in Guildford, England in 1989. She has cerebral palsy which mainly affects the left side of her body. She was educated at George Abbot School in her home town. In 2012 Hermitage gave birth to her first child.

== Sporting career ==
Hermitage took up athletics as a school girl and joined Guildford & Godalming Athletics Club. At the age of 14, frustrated by her lack of progress compared to her peers, she was approached by coach Hazel Childs who suggested she switch to parasports. Hermitage took the advice badly and quit athletics in protest, though she later admitted regretting this decision.

In 2012, following the London Paralympics and inspired to leave a legacy to her newborn daughter, Hermitage decided to become classified as a parasport athlete. She was classified as a T37 competitor and in 2013 she entered her first meets as a disability runner. She intended to compete throughout 2014, but a stress fracture to her foot saw her miss the majority of that year's competition including the 2014 IPC Athletics European Championships in Swansea.

In February 2015, Hermitage made her international debut when she travelled to Dubai to take part in the Fazaa International, the first IPC Grand Prix of the year. At the meet she ran 14.22 to set a new personal best in the 100m sprint, winning gold in the process. In June that year Hermitage represented Great Britain again when she competed at the Berlin IPC Grand Prix. There she entered the 100m, 200m and 400m sprints. She won all three events, posting personal bests in the 100m (13.80s) and 200m (28.48s) and beating Lisa McIntosh's 15-year-old record in the T37 400m sprint with a time of 1:02.70. Just over a month later Hermitage entered her third Grand Prix of the year, held at the Olympic Park in London. There she improved on her record in the 400m winning the race in 1:02.48.

At the end of 2015 Hermitage represented Great Britain at the IPC Athletics World Championships in Doha. There she entered the T37 100m and 400m sprints. In the heats for the 100m she recorded a personal best of 13.79, finishing second to teammate Kadeena Cox who set a new world record. In the finals the result was the same, Hermitage came second to Cox to win silver, her first major international medal. Three days later Hermitage competed in her favoured 400m event. Her time of 1:02.01 was an improvement of her own world record, beating the World Champion, France's Mandy Francois-Elie, into second place.

At the 2016 Rio Paralympics, Hermitage won the T37 100m final in a time of 13.13 to take the gold medal. She also won gold in the T37 400m and silver in the T35-38 4 × 100 m relay.

She was appointed Member of the Order of the British Empire (MBE) in the 2017 New Year Honours for services to athletics.

Hermitage retired in early 2020.
