= Nantenin Keïta =

French Paralympic athlete

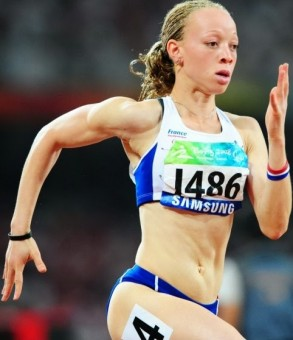

Medal record

Women's para athletics

Representing France

Paralympic Games
Gold medal – first place	2016 Rio de Janeiro	400 m T13
Silver medal – second place	2008 Beijing	200 m T13
Bronze medal – third place	2008 Beijing	400 m T13
Bronze medal – third place	2012 London	100 m T13

World Championships
Gold medal – first place	2015 Doha	400 m T13
Gold medal – first place	2006 Assen	200 m T13
Gold medal – first place	2006 Assen	400 m T13
Silver medal – second place	2015 Doha	100 m T13
Silver medal – second place	2006 Assen	100 m T13
Silver medal – second place	2002 Villeneuve-d'Ascq	400 m T13
Bronze medal – third place	2011 Christchurch	100 m T13

European Championships
Gold medal – first place	2014 Swansea	400 m T13
Gold medal – first place	2016 Grosseto	200 m T13
Gold medal – first place	2016 Grosseto	400 m T13
Bronze medal – third place	2021 Bydgoszcz	400 m T13

Nantenin Keïta (born 5 November 1984) is a French athlete who competes mainly in Paralympic category T13 sprint events. She is the daughter of the Malian musician Salif Keita and thus a direct descendant of the founder of the Mali Empire, Sundiata Keita. Like her father, she was born with albinism, and is visually impaired.

== Competition ==
She competed in the 2008 Summer Paralympics in Beijing, China. There she won a silver medal in the women's 200 metre T13 event; won a bronze medal in the women's 400 metre T13; finished fourth in the women's 100 metre T13; and finished fourth in the women's long jump F13.

She also took bronze in the 2012 Summer Paralympics (London) 100 metre T13.

In the 2014 IPC Athletics European Championships in Swansea, she won the gold medal in the women's 400 metre T13. The next year she followed her European success with two medals at the 2015 IPC Athletics World Championships in Doha. She won silver in the T13 100m and took gold in the 400m to add the world title to her accolades. At the 2016 IPC Athletics European Championships she successfully defended her 400m title and added the 100m title too. She was one of the five French Paralympians who lit the cauldron of the 2024 Summer Paralympics in Paris.
