= Moatez Jomni =

British Paralympic athlete (born 1989)

Personal information
- Born: 19 February 1989 (age 37) Tunisia

Sport
- Country: United Kingdom
- Sport: Track and field
- Disability class: T53
- Event(s): 100m, 200m, 400m, 800m
- Club: Weir Archer Academy
- Team: Great Britain
- Coached by: Jenny Archer

Achievements and titles
- Paralympic finals: 2016 Rio de Janeiro
Medal record
Men's Paralympic athletics
IPC Athletics World Championships
Bronze medal – third place	2015 Doha	200 m T53
IPC European Championships
Gold medal – first place	2014 Swansea	400 m T53
Bronze medal – third place	2014 Swansea	800 m T53
Gold medal – first place	2016 Grosseto	200 m T53
Silver medal – second place	2016 Grosseto	400 m T53
Silver medal – second place	2016 Grosseto	800 m T53
Bronze medal – third place	2016 Grosseto	100 m T53

Moatez 'Mo' Jomni (born 19 February 1989) is a British Paralympic athlete who competes mainly in category T53 sprint events and middle-distance events.

== Early life ==
Jomni was born in Tunisia in 1989. At the age of four Jomni was hit and run over by two vehicles. The accident left him in a critical condition and he spent the next six months in a coma. When Jomni was six his father took a job in London and the family moved with him. Jomni spent the next five years undergoing medical rehabilitation for his injuries, including spinal fixation.

== Athletics career ==
At the age of 23, Jomni was inspired by watching the 2012 Summer Paralympics on his television. He contacted UK Athletics who placed him in touch with the Weir Archer academy, who took him on as a potential athlete. By 2013 Jomni was classified as a T53 track athlete and began competing at a national level, mainly in sprint events. The following year Jomni entered his first major international competition when he was selected for the Great Britain team at the 2014 IPC Athletics European Championships in Swansea. There he entered two events, the T53 400 metre and 800 metre races. His time of 1:53.30 in the 800m was good enough to secure a bronze medal in the 800m. He followed this with his first international gold medal when in the 400m, in a limited field, he finished in a time of 52.78 ahead of France's Nicolas Brignone.

The following year Jomni travelled to Doha to compete at the 2015 IPC Athletics World Championships. He entered four events, the 100m, 200m, 400 m and 800 m races all in the T53 classification. He qualified through the heats of all four events to reach the finals, achieving a bronze in the 200 metres final. The following year, in the build-up to the Summer Paralympics in Rio, Jomni travelled to Grosseto to take part in his second European Championships. At the Championships, despite losing his 400m title to Russia's Vitalii Gritsenko, he still finished as one of the British team's most successful athletes with five medals. Jomni won a bronze medal in the 100m, silvers in both the 400m and 800m and gold medals in the 200 m and 4 × 400 m relay. In the relay Jomni shared the win with his club mentor and team-mate David Weir, alongside Richard Chiassaro and Nathan Maguire.
