= Krzysztof Ciuksza =

Polish Paralympic athlete

Personal information
- Born: 29 November 1997 (age 28) Gorzów Wielkopolski, Poland
- Height: 1.75 m (5 ft 9 in)

Sport
- Country: Poland
- Sport: Paralympic athletics
- Disability: Cerebral palsy
- Disability class: T36
Medal record
Paralympic athletics
Representing Poland
World Championships
Silver medal – second place	2017 London	Men's 200m T36
Silver medal – second place	2017 London	Men's 400m T36
European Championships
Gold medal – first place	2018 Berlin	Men's 200m T36
Gold medal – first place	2018 Berlin	Men's 400m T36
Silver medal – second place	2016 Grosseto	Men's 400m T36
Bronze medal – third place	2016 Grosseto	Men's 800m T36
Bronze medal – third place	2018 Berlin	Men's 100m T36

Krzysztof Ciuksza (born 29 November 1997) is a Polish Paralympic athlete who competes in mainly sprinting events. He is a double World silver medalist and a double European champion and has participated at the 2016 Summer Paralympics where he narrowly missed out on a bronze medal in the men's 400m T36.
