= Stadio Olimpico Carlo Zecchini =

Football venue in Italy

Coordinates: 42°45′32″N 11°6′27″E

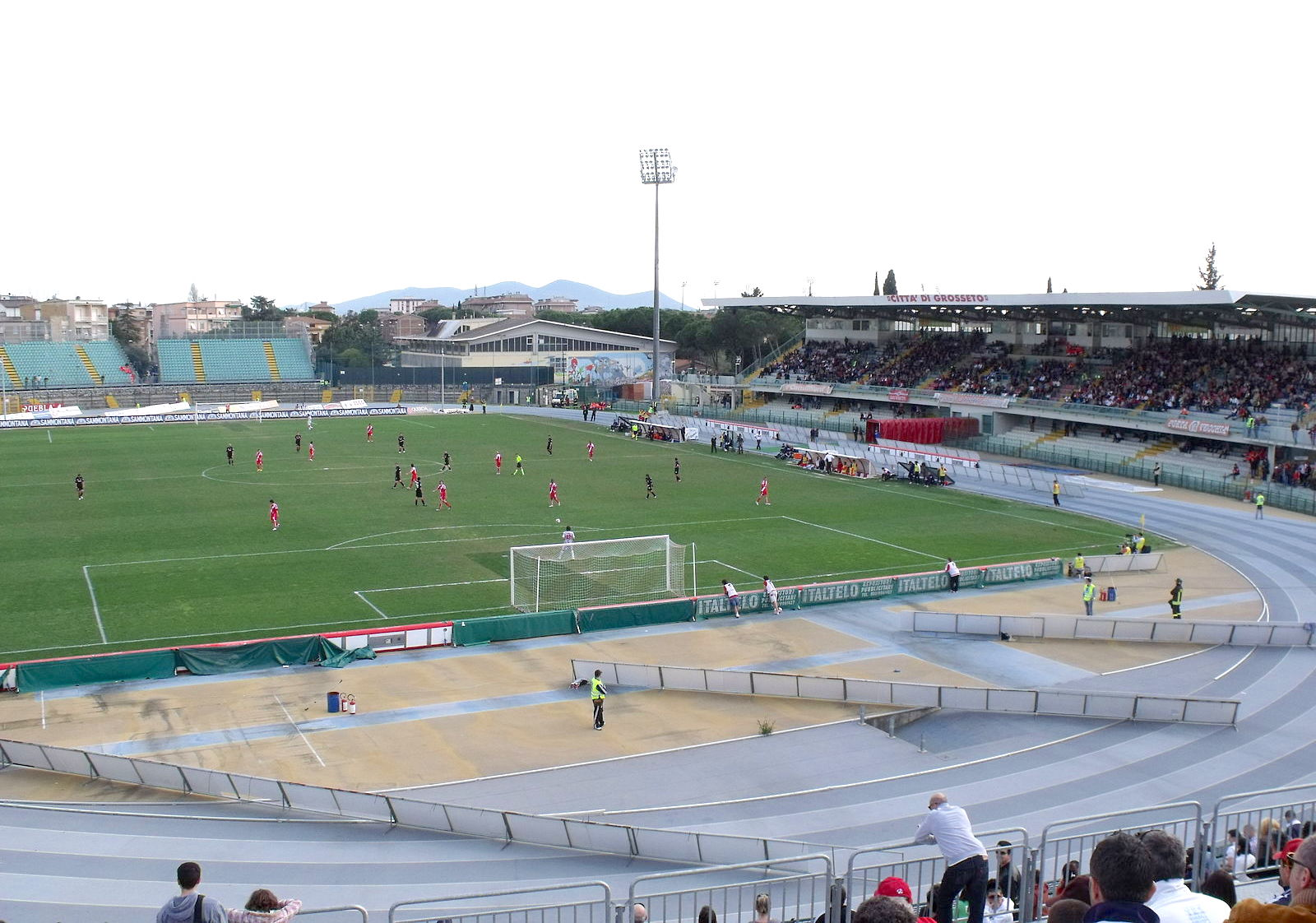
- The stadium on a matchday in April 2010
- Interactive map of Stadio Olimpico Carlo Zecchini
- Former names: Stadio Olimpico Comunale
- Location: Grosseto, Italy
- Owner: Municipality of Grosseto
- Capacity: 9,779
- Surface: Grass
- Field size: 105 m × 68 m

Construction
- Opened: 1952
- Renovated: 2007
- Architects: Raffaello Fagnoni, Enrico Bianchini, Dagoberto Ortensi

Tenant
- U.S. Grosseto F.C.

Stadio Olimpico Carlo Zecchini (formerly known as Stadio Olimpico Comunale) is a multi-use stadium in Grosseto, Italy. It is currently used mostly for football matches and is the home ground of U.S. Grosseto. The stadium holds 10,200.

During the 1960 Summer Olympics in Rome, the stadium hosted several football preliminaries. It has also hosted home matches of U.S. Gavorrano and U.S. Pianese.
