= 2016 IPC Athletics European Championships =

Track and field competition

IPC Athletics European Championships
- Host city: Grosseto, Italy
- Events: Track and field
- Dates: 10 – 16 June
- Main venue: Stadio Olimpico Carlo Zecchini

The 2016 IPC Athletics European Championships was a track and field competition for athletes with a disability open to International Paralympic Committee (IPC) affiliated countries within Europe, plus Israel. It was held in Grosseto, Italy and took part between 10 and 16 June. The competition was staged at Stadio Olimpico Carlo Zecchini. Approximately 700 athletes from 35 countries attended the games. This was the last edition of the event held under the IPC Athletics title.

Russia topped the medal tables in both gold medals won (51) and total number of medals won (131).

== Venue ==

The venue for the Championships was the Stadio Olimpico Carlo Zecchini athletics stadium which has held IPC Grand Prix athletic tournaments in the past. The stadium has an eight lane MONDO track and has a capacity of 10,200 people.

== Format ==
The 2016 IPC Athletics European Championships was an invitational tournament taking in track and field events. No combined sports were included in the 2016 Championships. Not all events were open to all classifications, though no events were contested between classifications.

Athletes finishing in first place are awarded the gold medal, second place the silver medal and third place the bronze. If only three competitors are available to challenge for an event then no bronze medal is awarded. Some events will be classed as 'no medal' events.

== Events ==
=== Classification ===
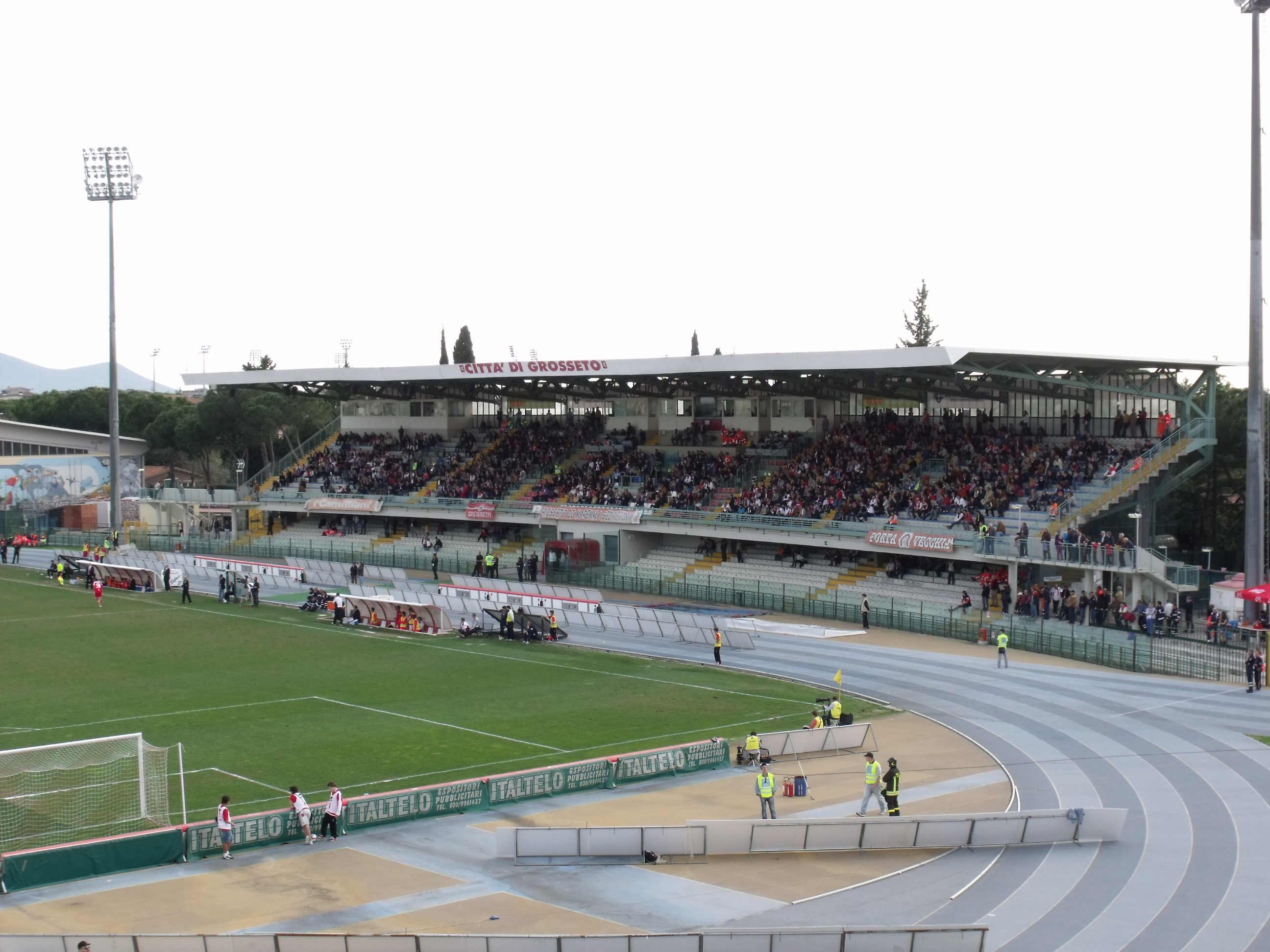
Stadio Olimpico Carlo Zecchini in 2010

To ensure competition is as fair and balanced as possible, athletes are classified dependent on how their disability impacts on their chosen event/s. Thus athletes may compete in an event against competitors with a different disability to themselves. Where there are more than one classification in one event, (for example discus throw F54/55/56), a points system is used to determine the winner.

- F = field athletes
- T = track athletes
- 11-13 – visually impaired, 11 and 12 compete with a sighted guide
- 20 – intellectual disability
- 31-38 – cerebral palsy or other conditions that affect muscle co-ordination and control. Athletes in class 31-34 compete in a seated position; athletes in class 35-38 compete standing.
- 40-47 – amputation, les autres
- 51-58 – wheelchair athletes

=== Schedule ===
●	Opening ceremony	Events	●	Closing ceremony

Date →		10	11	12	13	14	15	16
100 m	Men; Details		T11	T52; T42; T12; T51; T13	T34; T33	T36	T35; T53; T54; T44; T47	T38
100 m	Women; Details		T34	T35		T11	T13; T12; T42; T54; T37; T53; T38	T44; T47
200 m	Men; Details			T53; T54; T38	T11; T35; T47	T12; T13; T34; T44	T42	T36
200 m	Women; Details		T11; T13; T53/54	T12; T38	T47; T44	T37	T35	
400 m	Men; Details			T34; T44	T54; T36; T53; T52	T51; T38	T12; T20	T13
400 m	Women; Details			T34; T47	T12; T38; T54; T53	T44; T13	T20	
800 m	Men; Details			T13	T20		T53; T36	T38; T34
800 m	Women; Details			T20		T54; T34		
1500 m	Men; Details		T52; T20	T38; T11	T46	T13		T54
1500 m	Women; Details		T20; T11				T13	T54
5000 m	Men; Details			T54	T11			T13
5000 m	Women; Details			T54				
4 × 100 m relay	Men; Details							T11-13; T42-47
4 × 100 m relay	Women; Details							T11-13; T35-38
4 × 400 m relay	Men; Details							T53/54
Long jump	Men; Details		T36	T44	T37	T11; T47; T42	T12; T13	T38; T20
Long jump	Women; Details		T42-44; T47	T37	T12; T38		T11	T20
High jump	Men; Details		T12; T42-44	T47				
Shot put	Men; Details		F40/41; F46	F20; F42	F12; F38; F35	F36; F37	F53; F35; F55	F32; F33; F57
Shot put	Women; Details		F34; F53/54; F57; F12	F32/33; F44; F55	F40/41		F35/36	F20; F37
Discus throw	Men; Details		F56; F34	F52; F44-46; F57		F42	F11	F37; F12
Discus throw	Women; Details			F38	F57	F55	F40/41; F11/12	
Javelin throw	Men; Details		F11; F37/38	F13	F54; F34; F55	F57	F44; F40/41	F46
Javelin throw	Women; Details				F11-13	F37	F34	F54; F56
Club throw	Men; Details					F51; F32		
Club throw	Women; Details						F31/32/51	
Ceremonies		●						●

== Medal table ==
Host nation (Italy)

Rank	Nation	Gold	Silver	Bronze	Total
1	Russia	51	51	29	131
2	Great Britain	23	17	16	56
3	Poland	22	11	17	50
4	Germany	13	21	9	43
5	France	10	4	6	20
6	Spain	7	7	7	21
7	Turkey	6	4	5	15
8	Finland	5	3	4	12
9	Croatia	4	4	0	8
10	Bulgaria	3	6	4	13
11	Greece	3	4	2	9
12	Lithuania	3	2	3	8
13	Italy*	2	5	6	13
14	Sweden	2	5	2	9
15	Belarus	2	3	5	10
16	Serbia	2	2	2	6
17	Latvia	2	2	1	5
18	Ireland	2	1	2	5
19	Belgium	2	0	1	3
20	Portugal	1	4	7	12
21	Czech Republic	1	3	2	6
22	Denmark	1	2	2	5
23	Austria	1	2	1	4
24	Montenegro	1	2	0	3
25	Switzerland	1	1	5	7
26	Iceland	1	0	0	1
27	Hungary	0	2	2	4
28	Slovakia	0	1	3	4
29	Luxembourg	0	1	1	2
30	Cyprus	0	1	0	1
31	Norway	0	0	1	1
31	Romania	0	0	1	1
Totals (32 entries)		171	171	146	488

=== Multiple medallists ===
Many competitors won multiple medals at the 2016 Championships. The following athletes won four medals or more.

Name	Country	Medal	Event
Natalia Kocherova	Russia	Gold; Gold; Gold; Gold; Gold; Silver	200m - T53-54; 400m - T54; 800m - T54; 1500m - T54; 5000m - T54; 100m - T54
Georgina Hermitage	Great Britain	Gold; Gold; Gold; Gold	100m - T37; 200m - T37; 400m - T38; 4x100m relay - T35-38
David Weir	Great Britain	Gold; Gold; Gold; Gold	400m - T54; 800m - T54; 1500m - T54; 5000m - T54
Henry Manni	Finland	Gold; Gold; Gold; Silver	100m - T34; 200m - T34; 400m - T34; 800m - T34
Moatez Jomni	Great Britain	Gold; Silver; Silver; Bronze	200m - T53; 400m - T53; 800m - T53; 100m - T53
Aleksei Bychenok	Russia	Silver; Silver; Silver; Bronze; Bronze; Bronze	200m - T54; 1500m - T54; 5000m - T54; 100m - T54; 400m - T54; 800m T54
Gunilla Wallengren	Sweden	Silver; Silver; Silver; Bronze	400m - T54; 800m - T54; 5000m - T54; 1500m - T54

== Participating nations ==
Below is the list of countries who agreed to participate in the Championships and the requested number of athlete places for each.

- Austria (7)
- Belarus (10)
- Belgium (8)
- Bulgaria (12)
- Croatia (17)
- Cyprus (1)
- Denmark (8)
- Estonia (3)
- Finland (10)
- France (24)
- Germany (30)
- Great Britain (48)
- Greece (16)
- Hungary (7)
- Ireland (9)
- Iceland (4)
- Israel (2)
- Italy (36)
- Latvia (5)
- Lithuania (11)
- Luxembourg (1)
- Moldova (2)
- Montenegro (3)
- Norway (7)
- Poland (51)
- Portugal (25)
- Romania (5)
- Russia (100)
- Serbia (10)
- Slovakia (7)
- Slovenia (1)
- Spain (34)
- Sweden (11)
- Switzerland (8)
- Turkey (26)

== See also ==
- 2016 European Athletics Championships

== Footnotes ==
Notes
