= 2015 IPC Athletics World Championships – Men's marathon =

The men's marathon at the 2015 IPC Athletics World Championships was held in the streets of London on 26 April as part of the 2015 London Marathon.

== Classification ==
Athletes were given a classification depending on the type and extent of their disability. The classification system allowed athletes to compete against others with a similar level of function.

The athletics classifications are:

- 11–13: Blind (11) and visually impaired (12, 13) athletes
- 31–38: Athletes with cerebral palsy
- 51–58: Athletes with a spinal cord disability

The class numbers were given prefixes of "T", "F" and "P" for track, field and pentathlon events, respectively.

Visually impaired athletes classified 11 run with full eye shades and a guide runner; those classified 12 have the option of using a guide; those classified 13 did not use a guide runner.

== Events ==
=== T12 ===
The T12 classification marathon was contested by T12 and T11 athletes. Up to two guide runners were allowed to support each competitor.

Rank	Name	Nationality	Time	Notes
1st place, gold medalist(s)	El Amin Chentouf	Morocco	2:21:33	WR
2nd place, silver medalist(s)	Alberto Suárez Laso	Spain	2:21:47	
3rd place, bronze medalist(s)	Tadashi Horikoshi	Japan	2:27:42	
4	Masahiro Okamura	Japan	2:31:40	
5	Yutaka Kumagai	Japan	2:37:48	
6	Gabriel Macchi	Portugal	2:38:11	
7	Oleg Antipin	Spain	2:42:14	
8	Joaquim Machado	Portugal	2:44:02	
9	Nicolas Bompard	France	2:44:27	
10	Jorge Pina	Portugal	2:44:29	
11	Igor Khavlin	Russia	2:44:37	
12	Elkin Alonso Serna Moreno	Colombia	2:48:16	
13	Masato Hatate	Japan	2:49:12	
14	Sandi Novak	Slovenia	2:51:38	
15	Csaba Orban	Hungary	2:59:14	
16	Ralf Arnold	Germany	2:59:56	

=== T13 ===
Rank	Name	Nationality	Time	Notes
1st place, gold medalist(s)	Aniceto Antonio Dos Santos	Brazil	2:35:42	
2nd place, silver medalist(s)	Youssef Benibrahim	Morocco	2:36:07	
3rd place, bronze medalist(s)	Tim Prendergast	New Zealand	2:47:23	
4	Jason Romero	United States	2:51:53	
5	Stephen Marklew	Great Britain	3:01:03	

=== T46 ===
The T46 classification marathon was contested by T46 and T45 athletes.

Rank	Name	Nationality	Time	Notes
1st place, gold medalist(s)	Abderrahman Ait Khamouch	Spain	2:26:54	WR
2nd place, silver medalist(s)	Alex Pires Da Silva	Brazil	2:27:36	
3rd place, bronze medalist(s)	Alessandro Di Lello	Italy	2:31:25	
4	Ahmed Farhat	Morocco	2:40:21	
5	Derek Rae	Great Britain	2:40:40	
6	Ezequiel Da Costa	Brazil	2:41:35	
7	Mario Bauer	Austria	2:41:50	
8	Manuel Mendes	Portugal	2:44:35	
9	Pedro Meza	Austria	2:44:52	
10	José Monteiro	Portugal	3:11:34	
11	Isidro Vildosola	Philippines	3:20:04	

=== T52 ===
The T52 classification marathon was contested by T52 and T51 athletes.

Rank	Name	Nationality	Time	Notes
1st place, gold medalist(s)	Raymond Martin	United States	1:52:27	
2nd place, silver medalist(s)	Santiago Sanz	Spain	1:53:33	
3rd place, bronze medalist(s)	Cristian Torres	Colombia	2:08:52	
4	Rob Smith	Great Britain	2:12:43	
5	Hirokazu Ueyonabaru	Japan	2:40:08	
6	Stefan Strobel	Germany	3:08:00	

=== T54 ===
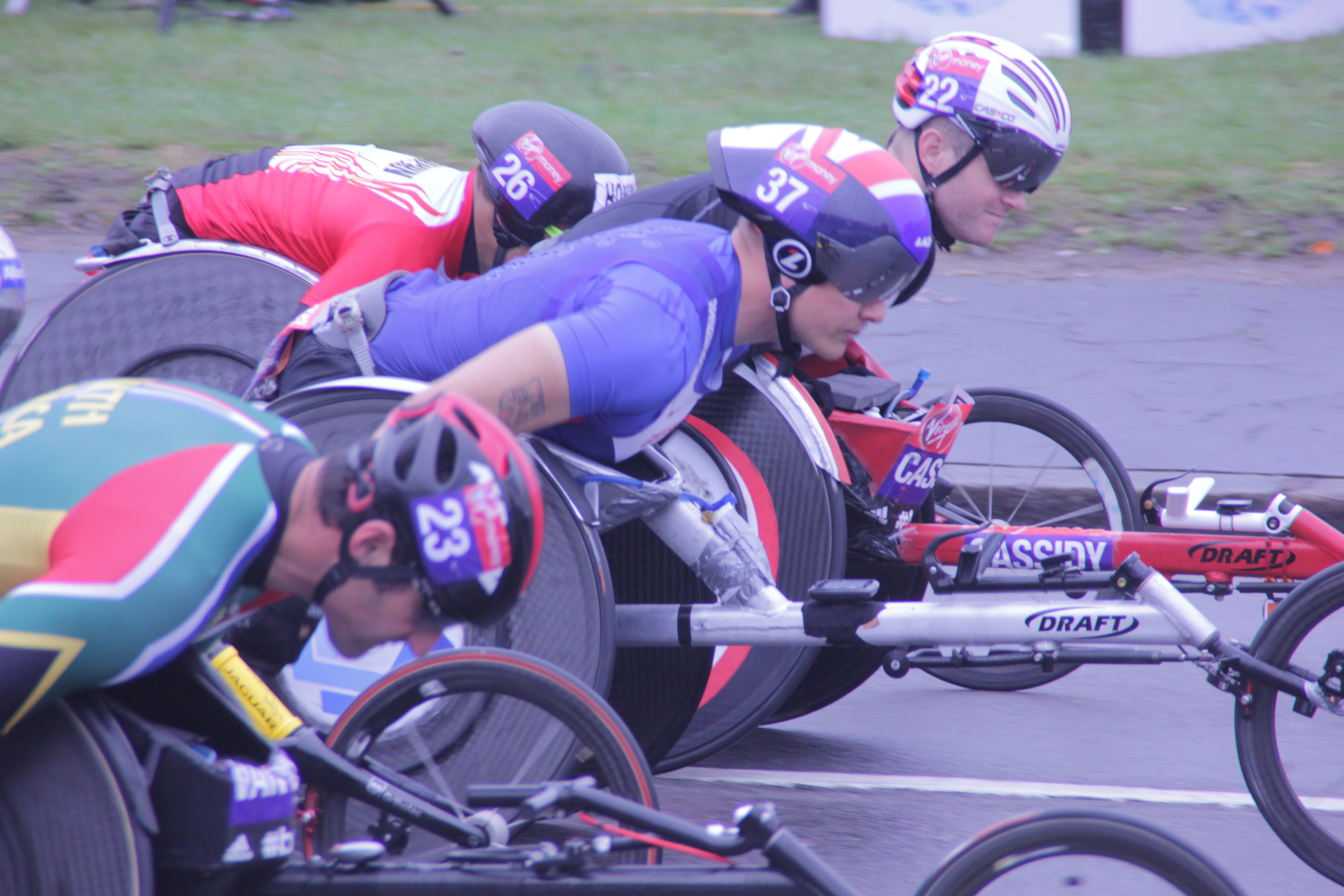
Elite wheelchair competitors at the start of the London Marathon: David Weir (37) 2nd, Josh Cassidy (22), Ernst van Dyk (23) 5th, Kota Hokinoue (26) 7th

The T54 classification marathon was contested by T54 and T53 athletes.

Rank	Name	Nationality	Time	Notes
1st place, gold medalist(s)	Joshua George	United States	1:31:31	
2nd place, silver medalist(s)	David Weir	Great Britain	1:31:32	
3rd place, bronze medalist(s)	Masazumi Soejima	Japan	1:31:33	
4	Pierre Fairbank	France	1:31:33	
5	Ernst Van Dyk	South Africa	1:31:38	
6	Tomasz Hamerlak	Poland	1:31:56	
7	Kota Hokinoue	Japan	1:32:22	
8	Jordi Madera	Spain	1:33:22	
9	Heinz Frei	Switzerland	1:32:23	
10	Simon Lawson	Great Britain	1:34:21	
11	Ryota Yoshida	Japan	1:35:35	
12	Alhassane Balde	Germany	1:38:31	
13	Tobias Loetscher	Switzerland	1:38:32	
14	Laurens Molina	Costa Rica	1:38:32	
15	Denis Lemeunier	France	1:38:33	
16	Ebbe Blichfeldt	Denmark	1:38:34	
17	Hiroki Nishida	Japan	1:41:48	
18	Hiroyuki Yamamoto	Japan	1:43:29	
19	Alexey Bychenok	Russia	1:46:06	
20	John Smith	Great Britain	1:46:17	
21	Cornel Villiger	Switzerland	1:46:18	
22	Justin Levene	Great Britain	1:46:20	
23	Patrick Monahan	Ireland	1:46:47	
24	Alexandrino Silva	Portugal	1:47:07	
25	Mark Telford	Great Britain	1:50:49	
	Josh Cassidy	Canada	DNF	
	Marcel Hug	Switzerland	DNF	
	Rafael Botello Jimenez	Spain	DNF	

== See also ==
- List of IPC world records in athletics
