= 2012 IPC Athletics European Championships – Men's 1500 metres =

The men's 1,500 metres at the 2012 IPC Athletics European Championships was held at Stadskanaal Stadium from 24 to 28 July.

== Medalists ==
Results given by IPC Athletics.

Class	Gold	Silver	Bronze
T11	Mikael Andersen; Denmark	Nuno Alves; Portugal	Carlos Amaral Ferreira; Portugal
T13	Egor Sharov; Russia	Alexey Akhtyamov; Russia	Łukasz Wietecki; Poland
T20	Rafal Korc; Poland	Andriy Goliney; Ukraine	Viacheslav Khrustalev; Russia
T46	Abderrahman Ait Khamouch; Spain	Cahit Kilicaslan; Turkey	Davide Dalla Palma; Italy
T54	Tomasz Hamerlak; Poland	Alexey Bychenok; Russia	Ivan Goncharov; Russia

== Results ==
=== T11 ===
Final

Rank	Sport Class	Name	Nationality	Time	Notes
1st place, gold medalist(s)	T11	Mikael Andersen	Denmark	4:19.05	
2nd place, silver medalist(s)	T11	Nuno Alves	Portugal	4:21.66	SB
3rd place, bronze medalist(s)	T11	Carlos Amaral Ferreira	Portugal	4:31.60	SB
4	T11	Albert Asadullin	Russia	4:33.41	
5	T11	Artem Tayganov	Russia	4:42.16	

=== T13 ===
Final

Rank	Sport Class	Name	Nationality	Time	Notes
1st place, gold medalist(s)	T12	Egor Sharov	Russia	3:58.24	
2nd place, silver medalist(s)	T13	Alexey Akhtyamov	Russia	3:58,47	ER
3rd place, bronze medalist(s)	T13	Łukasz Wietecki	Poland	3:59.39	SB
4	T13	Dmitrii Kornilov	Russia	3:59.95	SB
5	T12	Ignacio Avila	Spain	4:05.38	
6	T12	Cesar Romero Garcia	Spain	4:25.09	
—	T12	Semih Deniz	Turkey	DNF	
—	T12	Lukas Flek	Czech Republic	DQ	

=== T20 ===
Heats

Rank	Heat	Sport Class	Name	Nationality	Time	Notes
1	1	T20	Viktor Shcherbyna	Ukraine	4:18.56	Q
2	1	T20	Andriy Goliney	Ukraine	4:18.78	Q
3	1	T20	Rafal Korc	Poland	4:88.88	Q
4	2	T20	Viacheslav Khrustalev	Russia	4:19.25	Q
5	1	T20	Samuel Freitas	Portugal	4:19.32	q
6	2	T20	Daniel Pek	Poland	4:19.83	Q
7	2	T20	Vasyl Volosyanko	Ukraine	4:20.09	Q
8	2	T20	Tadeusz Chudzynski	Poland	4:20.50	q
9	2	T20	Werner Gentle	Netherlands	4:20.77	q
10	2	T20	Jose Martinez Morote	Spain	4:21.36	
—	1	T20	Goran Jelic	Croatia	DNS	

Final

Rank	Sport Class	Name	Nationality	Time	Notes
1st place, gold medalist(s)	T20	Rafal Korc	Poland	4:01.10	
2nd place, silver medalist(s)	T20	Andriy Goliney	Ukraine	4:01.42	SB
3rd place, bronze medalist(s)	T20	Viacheslav Khrustalev	Russia	4:01.77	
4	T20	Daniel Pek	Poland	4:01.77	
5	T20	Viktor Shcherbyna	Ukraine	4:02.20	
6	T20	Samuel Freitas	Portugal	4:08.68	
7	T20	Vasyl Volosyanko	Ukraine	4:12.95	
8	T20	Werner Gentle	Netherlands	4:14.07	
9	T20	Tadeusz Chudzynski	Poland	4:24.09	

=== T46 ===
Final

Rank	Sport Class	Name	Nationality	Time	Notes
1st place, gold medalist(s)	T46	Abderrahman Ait Khamouch	Spain	4:09.88	
2nd place, silver medalist(s)	T46	Cahit Kilicaslan	Turkey	4:10.23	
3rd place, bronze medalist(s)	T46	Davide Dalla Palma	Italy	4:10.63	
4	T46	Wojciech Golaski	Poland	4:13.17	
—	T46	Jose Monteiro	Portugal	DNF	
—	T46	Marcin Awizen	Poland	DNF	

=== T54 ===
Rank	Sport Class	Name	Nationality	Time	Notes
1st place, gold medalist(s)	T54	Tomasz Hamerlak	Poland	3:25.08	
2nd place, silver medalist(s)	T54	Alexey Bychenok	Russia	3:29.40	
3rd place, bronze medalist(s)	T54	Ivan Goncharov	Russia	3:29.45	
4	T54	Tobias Loetscher	Switzerland	3:31.74	
5	T54	Ebbe Blichfeldt	Denmark	3:32.12	
6	T54	Grigory Murygin	Russia	3:40.75	

== See also ==
- List of IPC world records in athletics
