= 2014 IPC Athletics European Championships – Men's 5000 metres =

The men's 5000 metres at the 2014 IPC Athletics European Championships was held at the Swansea University Stadium from 18–23 August. There were final events taken place; no heat events were contested.

== Medalists ==
| Event | Gold | | Silver | | Bronze | |
|---|---|---|---|---|---|---|
| T11 | Nuno Alves; Portugal | 16:10.72 | Hasan Huseyin Kacar; Turkey | 16:50.59 | Carlos Amaral Ferreira; Portugal | 17.14.46 |
| T13 | Alberto Suárez Laso (T12); Spain | 14:56.03 | Alexey Akhtyamov (T13); Russia | 15:07.13 | Gustavo Nieves (T13); Spain | 15:31.23 |
| T54 | Marcel Hug; Switzerland | 11:36.19 | Alhassane Baldé (T13); Germany | 12:14.19 | Tomasz Hamerlak (T13); Poland | 12:14.47 |

== Results ==
=== T11 ===
| Rank | Sport Class | Name | Nationality | Time | Notes |
|---|---|---|---|---|---|
| 1st place, gold medalist(s) | T11 | Nuno Alves | Portugal | 16:10.72 | SB |
| 2nd place, silver medalist(s) | T11 | Hasan Huseyin Kacar | Turkey | 16:50.59 | PB |
| 3rd place, bronze medalist(s) | T11 | Carlos Amaral Ferreira | Portugal | 17:14.46 | PB |
| 4 | T11 | Sandi Novak | Slovenia | 17:37.48 | PB |
| — | T11 | Manuel Garnica Roldan | Spain | DQ | |

=== T13 ===
| Rank | Sport Class | Name | Nationality | Time | Notes |
|---|---|---|---|---|---|
| 1st place, gold medalist(s) | T12 | Alberto Suarez Laso | Spain | 14:56.03 | SB |
| 2nd place, silver medalist(s) | T13 | Alexey Akhtyamov | Russia | 15:07.13 | ER |
| 3rd place, bronze medalist(s) | T13 | Gustavo Nieves | Spain | 15:31.23 | SB |
| 4 | T13 | Jean-Baptiste Chirol | France | 15:50.78 | PB |
| 5 | T12 | Oguz Akbulut | Turkey | 16:07.96 | PB |
| 6 | T13 | Lukasz Wietecki | Poland | 16:18.61 | |
| 7 | T12 | Andrew Flynn | Ireland | 16:47.69 | PB |

=== T54 ===
| Rank | Sport Class | Name | Nationality | Time | Notes |
|---|---|---|---|---|---|
| 1st place, gold medalist(s) | T54 | Marcel Hug | Switzerland | 11:36.19 | |
| 2nd place, silver medalist(s) | T54 | Alhassane Baldé | Germany | 12:14.19 | |
| 3rd place, bronze medalist(s) | T54 | Tomasz Hamerlak | Poland | 12:14.47 | |
| 4 | T53 | Roger Puigbo Verdaguer | Spain | 12:14.65 | |
| 5 | T54 | Tobias Loetscher | Switzerland | 12:17.53 | |
| 6 | T54 | Julien Casoli | France | 12:19.04 | |
| 7 | T54 | Ebbe Blichfeldt | Denmark | 12:21.18 | |

== See also ==
- List of IPC world records in athletics
