= 2012 IPC Athletics European Championships – Women's 400 metres =

The women's 400 metres at the 2012 IPC Athletics European Championships was held at Stadskanaal Stadium from 24–28 July.

== Medalists ==
Results given by IPC Athletics.

Class	Gold	Silver	Bronze
T12	Svetlana Makeeva; Russia	Miroslava Sedláčková; Czech Republic	Veronika Zotova; Russia
T13	Alexandra Dimoglou; Greece	Olena Gliebova; Ukraine	Anna Duzikowska; Poland
T37	Maryna Snisar; Ukraine	Evgeniya Trushnikova; Russia	Anastasiya Ovsyannikova; Russia
T54	Amanda Kotaja; Finland	Gunilla Wallengren; Sweden	Alexandra Helbling; Switzerland

== Results ==
=== T12 ===
Heats

Rank	Heat	Sport Class	Name	Nationality	Time	Notes
1	1	T12	Svetlana Makeeva	Russia	0.00	Q, SB
2	2	T12	Veronika Zotova	Russia	0.00	Q, SB
3	3	T11	Miroslava Sedláčková	Czech Republic	0.00	Q
4	3	T11	Anastasia Frolova	Russia	0.00	
5	2	T12	Sumeyye Ozcan	Turkey	0.00	
—	1	T12	Elisabetta Stefanini	Italy	DNF	
—	2	T11	Tracey Hinton	United Kingdom	DNS	

Final

Rank	Sport Class	Name	Nationality	Time	Notes
1st place, gold medalist(s)	T12	Svetlana Makeeva	Russia	1:00.40	
2nd place, silver medalist(s)	T11	Miroslava Sedláčková	Czech Republic	1:02.72	SB
3rd place, bronze medalist(s)	T12	Veronika Zotova	Russia	1:03.15	SB

=== T13 ===
Final

Rank	Sport Class	Name	Nationality	Time	Notes
1st place, gold medalist(s)	T13	Alexandra Dimoglou	Greece	58.47	SB
2nd place, silver medalist(s)	T13	Olena Gliebova	Ukraine	59.22	
3rd place, bronze medalist(s)	T13	Anna Duzikowska	Poland	1:03.74	SB
4	T13	Asli Adali	Turkey	1:09.24	

=== T37 ===
Heats

Rank	Heat	Sport Class	Name	Nationality	Time	Notes
1	1	T37	Evgeniya Trushnikova	Russia	1:10.91	Q
2	2	T37	Maryna Snisar	Ukraine	1:11.14	Q
3	1	T37	Maike Hausberger	Germany	1:12.19	Q, SB
4	2	T37	Anastasiya Ovsyannikova	Russia	1:13.75	Q
5	2	T37	Isabelle Foerder	Germany	1:15.33	q
6	1	T37	Mandy Francois-Elie	France	1:20.00	q
7	2	T37	Oxana Corso	Italy	1:21.69	
8	2	T37	Maria Seifert	Germany	1:23.34	
—	1	T37	Viktoriya Kravchenko	Ukraine	DNF	
—	1	T37	Jenny McLoughlin	United Kingdom	DNS	

Final

Rank	Sport Class	Name	Nationality	Time	Notes
1st place, gold medalist(s)	T37	Maryna Snisar	Ukraine	1:07.90	ER
2nd place, silver medalist(s)	T37	Evgeniya Trushnikova	Russia	1:08.35	SB
3rd place, bronze medalist(s)	T37	Anastasiya Ovsyannikova	Russia	1:09.93	SB
4	T37	Isabelle Foerder	Germany	1:12.63	SB
5	T37	Mandy Francois-Elie	France	1:13.64	
—	T37	Maike Hausberger	Germany	DQ	

=== T54 ===
Final

Rank	Sport Class	Name	Nationality	Time	Notes
1st place, gold medalist(s)	T54	Amanda Kotaja	Finland	1:01.26	SB
2nd place, silver medalist(s)	T54	Gunilla Wallengren	Sweden	1:02.45	
3rd place, bronze medalist(s)	T54	Alexandra Helbling	Switzerland	1:05.45	
—	T54	Patricia Keller	Switzerland	DQ	

== See also ==
- List of IPC world records in athletics
