= 2012 IPC Athletics European Championships – Men's 800 metres =

The men's 800 metres at the 2012 IPC Athletics European Championships was held at Stadskanaal Stadium from 24–28 July.

== Medalists ==
Results given by IPC Athletics.

Class	Gold	Silver	Bronze
T12	Egor Sharov; Russia	Ignacio Avila; Spain	Mehmet Nesim Öner; Turkey
T13	Łukasz Wietecki; Poland	Alexey Akhtyamov; Russia	Oguz Akbulut; Turkey
T36	Evgenii Shvetcov; Russia	Artem Arefyev; Russia	Paul Blake; United Kingdom
T46	Alexey Kotlov; Russia	Abderrahman Ait Khamouch; Spain	Wojciech Golaski; Poland
T53	Roger Puigbo Verdaguer; Spain	Sergey Shilov; Russia	Edison Kasumaj; Switzerland
T54	Alexey Bychenok; Russia	Ivan Goncharov; Russia	N/A

== Results ==
=== T12 ===
Heats

Rank	Heat	Sport Class	Name	Nationality	Time	Notes
1	2	T12	Egor Sharov	Russia	1:56.37	Q
2	2	T12	Semih Deniz	Turkey	1:56.68	Q, SB
3	1	T12	Mehmet Nesim Oner	Turkey	1:59.00	Q SB
4	3	T12	Ignacio Avila	Spain	2:06.06	Q
5	3	T12	Lukas Flek	Czech Republic	2:08.25	
6	2	T12	Cesar Romero Garcia	Spain	2:08.41	
7	1	T12	Dmitry Miroshnichenko	Russia	DQ	

Final

Rank	Sport Class	Name	Nationality	Time	Notes
1st place, gold medalist(s)	T12	Egor Sharov	Russia	1:56.36	
2nd place, silver medalist(s)	T12	Ignacio Avila	Spain	1:56.66	SB
3rd place, bronze medalist(s)	T12	Mehmet Nesim Oner	Turkey	1:57.52	SB

=== T13 ===
Final

Rank	Sport Class	Name	Nationality	Time	Notes
1st place, gold medalist(s)	T13	Łukasz Wietecki	Poland	1:57.94	
2nd place, silver medalist(s)	T13	Alexey Akhtyamov	Russia	1:58.09	SB
3rd place, bronze medalist(s)	T13	Oguz Akbulut	Turkey	2:00.70	SB
4	T13	Egor Merkulov	Russia	2:02.49	

=== T36 ===
Heats

Rank	Heat	Sport Class	Name	Nationality	Time	Notes
1	1	T36	Evgenii Shvetcov	Russia	2:06.55	Q, WR
2	1	T36	Paul Blake	United Kingdom	2:09.10	Q, SB
3	1	T36	Pavel Kharagezov	Russia	2:17.53	q
4	1	T36	Jose Manuel Gonzalez	Spain	2:18.51	q
5	2	T36	Jose Pampano	Spain	2:25.59	Q
6	2	T36	Artem Arefyev	Russia	2:26.39	Q
7	1	T36	Jakub Rega	Poland	2:26,94	
8	2	T36	Alix Delorme	France	2:27.52	
9	2	T36	Angel Perez Galan	Spain	2:28.24	
10	2	T36	Robert Plichta	Poland	2:34.28	
—	2	T36	Aliaksandr Daniliuk	Belarus	DNF	

Final

Rank	Sport Class	Name	Nationality	Time	Notes
1st place, gold medalist(s)	T36	Evgenii Shvetcov	Russia	2:05.05	WR
2nd place, silver medalist(s)	T36	Artem Arefyev	Russia	2:06.19	SB
3rd place, bronze medalist(s)	T36	Paul Blake	United Kingdom	2:06.81	SB
4	T36	Jose Manuel Gonzalez	Spain	2:15.86	
5	T36	Pavel Kharagezov	Russia	2:16.91	
6	T36	Jose Pampano	Spain	2:18.79	SB

=== T46 ===
Heats

Rank	Heat	Sport Class	Name	Nationality	Time	Notes
1	1	T46	Cahit Kilicaslan	Turkey	2:04.80	Q
2	1	T46	Alexey Kotlov	Russia	2:05.18	Q
3	1	T46	Davide Dalla Palma	Italy	2:05.32	q
4	2	T46	Wojciech Golaski	Poland	2:05.54	Q
5	2	T46	Abderrahman Ait Khamouch	Spain	2:05.83	Q
6	2	T46	Jose Monteiro	Portugal	2:06.22	q
7	2	T46	Remi Mazi	Belgium	2:06.59	
—	1	T46	Marcin Awizen	Poland	DNF	

Final

Rank	Sport Class	Name	Nationality	Time	Notes
1st place, gold medalist(s)	T46	Alexey Kotlov	Russia	1:59.97	SB
2nd place, silver medalist(s)	T46	Abderrahman Ait Khamouch	Spain	2:00.49	
3rd place, bronze medalist(s)	T46	Wojciech Golaski	Poland	2:00.49	
4	T46	Cahit Kilicaslan	Turkey	2:00.55	SB
5	T46	Davide Dalla Palma	Italy	2:01.18	SB
6	T46	Jose Monteiro	Portugal	2:04.75	

=== T53 ===
Final

Rank	Sport Class	Name	Nationality	Time	Notes
1st place, gold medalist(s)	T53	Roger Puigbo Verdaguer	Spain	1:52.41	
2nd place, silver medalist(s)	T53	Sergey Shilov	Russia	1:55.35	
3rd place, bronze medalist(s)	T53	Edison Kasumaj	Switzerland	2:01.35	
4	T53	Korsan Vogel	Germany	2:05.99	

=== T54 ===
Final

Rank	Sport Class	Name	Nationality	Time	Notes
1st place, gold medalist(s)	T54	Alexey Bychenok	Russia	1:46.66	
2nd place, silver medalist(s)	T54	Ivan Goncharov	Russia	1:56.09	
3rd place, bronze medalist(s)	T54	Tomasz Hamerlak	Poland	1:58.64	

== See also ==
- List of IPC world records in athletics
