= 2014 IPC Athletics European Championships – Men's 1500 metres =

The men's 1500 metres at the 2014 IPC Athletics European Championships was held at the Swansea University Stadium from 18–23 August. There were only final events taken place; no heats events were taken place.

== Medalists ==
Event	Gold		Silver		Bronze	
T11	Semih Deniz; Turkey	4:19.51	Nuno Alves; Portugal	4:24.50	Manuel Garnica Roldán; Spain	4:26.83
T13	Mehmet Nesim Oner; Turkey	4:08.02	Alexey Akhtyamov; Russia	4:08.88	Lukasz Wietecki; Poland	4:09.41
T20	Viacheslav Khrustalev; Russia	4:00.08	Cristiano Pereira; Portugal	4:00.65	Pavel Sarkeev; Russia	4:02.71
T38	Michael McKillop (T37); Ireland	4:16.73	Louis Radius (T38); France	4:21.44	Dean Miller (T37); Great Britain	4:22.24
T52	Thomas Geierspichler; Austria	4:30.45	Rob Smith; Great Britain	4:44.20	—	
T54	Marcel Hug; Switzerland	3:21.55	Alhassane Balde; Germany	3.22.25	Julien Casoli; France	3:23.17

== Results ==
=== T11 ===
Rank	Sport Class	Name	Nationality	Time	Notes
1st place, gold medalist(s)	T11	Semih Deniz	Turkey	4:19.51	SB
2nd place, silver medalist(s)	T11	Nuno Alves	Portugal	4:24.50	
3rd place, bronze medalist(s)	T11	Manuel Garnica Roldan	Spain	4:26.83	PB
4	T11	Carlos Amaral Ferreira	Portugal	4:40.52	
—	T11	Hasan Huseyin Kacar	Turkey	DQ	

=== T13 ===
Rank	Sport Class	Name	Nationality	Time	Notes
1st place, gold medalist(s)	T13	Mehmet Nesim Oner	Turkey	4:08.02	PB
2nd place, silver medalist(s)	T13	Alexey Akhtyamov	Russia	4:08.88	
3rd place, bronze medalist(s)	T13	Lukasz Wietecki	Poland	4:09.41	SB
4	T12	Oguz Akbulut	Turkey	4:09.92	PB
5	T13	Jean-Baptiste Chirol	France	4:20.02	
6	T13	Mikhail Osipov	Russia	4:24.53	

=== T20 ===
Rank	Sport Class	Name	Nationality	Time	Notes
1st place, gold medalist(s)	T20	Viacheslav Khrustalev	Russia	4:00.08	
2nd place, silver medalist(s)	T20	Cristiano Pereira	Portugal	4:00.65	
3rd place, bronze medalist(s)	T20	Pavel Sarkeev	Russia	4:02.71	PB
4	T20	Pavlo Voluikevych	Ukraine	4:04.09	
5	T20	Samuel Freitas	Portugal	4:05.65	
6	T20	Alexander Rabotnitskiy	Russia	4:15.00	
—	T20	Jose Azevedo	Portugal	DNF	

=== T38 ===
Rank	Sport Class	Name	Nationality	Time	Notes
1st place, gold medalist(s)	T37	Michael McKillop	Ireland	4:16.73	
2nd place, silver medalist(s)	T38	Louis Radius	France	4:21.44	
3rd place, bronze medalist(s)	T37	Dean Miller	United Kingdom	4:22.24	
4	T38	Basile Meunier	Belgium	4:44.84	PB
5	T37	Valentyn Miedviediev	Ukraine	4:45.99	
6	T37	Petar Udovicic	Serbia	4:55.63	

=== T52 ===
Rank	Sport Class	Name	Nationality	Time	Notes
1st place, gold medalist(s)	T52	Thomas Geierspichler	Austria	4:30.45	
2nd place, silver medalist(s)	T52	Rob Smith	United Kingdom	4:44.20	
3	T52	Artem Shishkovskiy	Russia	5:08.21	

=== T54 ===
Rank	Sport Class	Name	Nationality	Time	Notes
1st place, gold medalist(s)	T54	Marcel Hug	Switzerland	3:21.55	
2nd place, silver medalist(s)	T54	Alhassane Balde	Germany	3:22.25	
3rd place, bronze medalist(s)	T54	Julien Casoli	France	3:23.17	
4	T54	Tomasz Hamerlak	Poland	3:23.36	
5	T53	Roger Puigbo Verdaguer	Spain	3:23.72	
6	T54	Tobias Loetscher	Switzerland	3:24.29	
—	T54	Ebbe Blichfeldt	Denmark	DNF	

== See also ==
- List of IPC world records in athletics
