= 2012 IPC Athletics European Championships – Women's 800 metres =

The women's 800 metres at the 2012 IPC Athletics European Championships was held at Stadskanaal Stadium from 24–28 July.

== Medalists ==
Results given by IPC Athletics.

Class	Gold	Silver	Bronze
T54	Patricia Keller; Switzerland	Alexandra Helbling; Switzerland	Gunilla Wallengren; Sweden

== Results ==
Final

Rank	Sport Class	Name	Nationality	Time	Notes
1st place, gold medalist(s)	T54	Patricia Keller	Switzerland	2:07.67	
2nd place, silver medalist(s)	T54	Alexandra Helbling	Switzerland	2:08.46	
3rd place, bronze medalist(s)	T54	Gunilla Wallengren	Sweden	2:08.76	
4	T54	Akzhana Abdikarimova	Russia	2:43.28	

== See also ==
- List of IPC world records in athletics
