= 2012 IPC Athletics European Championships – Women's 1500 metres =

The women's 1,500 metres at the 2012 IPC Athletics European Championships was held at Stadskanaal Stadium from 24 to 28 July.

== Medalists ==
Results given by IPC Athletics.

| Class | Gold | Silver | Bronze |
|---|---|---|---|
| T12 | Elena Pautova; Russia | Elena Congost; Spain | Annalisa Minetti; Italy |
| T20 | Barbara Niewiedzial; Poland | Arleta Meloch; Poland | Ilona Biacsi; Hungary |
| T54 | Gunilla Wallengren; Sweden | Alexandra Helbling; Switzerland | Amanda Kotaja; Finland |

== Results ==
=== T12 ===
Heats

| Rank | Heat | Sport Class | Name | Nationality | Time | Notes |
|---|---|---|---|---|---|---|
| 1 | 1 | T12 | Elena Congost | Spain | 5:04.33 | Q |
| 2 | 1 | T11 | Annalisa Minetti | Italy | 5:10.65 | q |
| 3 | 2 | T12 | Elena Pautova | Russia | 5:11.52 | Q |
| 4 | 2 | T12 | Maria Fiúza | Portugal | 5:16.41 | q |
| 5 | 1 | T12 | Yulia Mardanova | Russia | 5:18.42 | q, SB |
| 6 | 2 | T12 | Sumeyye Ozcan | Turkey | 5:23.17 | SB |

Final

| Rank | Sport Class | Name | Nationality | Time | Notes |
|---|---|---|---|---|---|
| 1st place, gold medalist(s) | T12 | Elena Pautova | Russia | 4:39.83 | |
| 2nd place, silver medalist(s) | T12 | Elena Congost | Spain | 4:44.34 | WR |
| 3rd place, bronze medalist(s) | T11 | Annalisa Minetti | Italy | 4:51.75 | SB |
| 4 | T12 | Maria Fiúza | Portugal | 5:02.35 | SB |
| 5 | T12 | Yulia Mardanova | Russia | 5:18.92 | |

=== T20 ===
Final

| Rank | Sport Class | Name | Nationality | Time | Notes |
|---|---|---|---|---|---|
| 1st place, gold medalist(s) | T20 | Barbara Niewiedzial | Poland | 4:23.37 | SB |
| 2nd place, silver medalist(s) | T20 | Arleta Meloch | Poland | 4:25.59 | SB |
| 3rd place, bronze medalist(s) | T20 | Ilona Biacsi | Hungary | 4:27.27 | SB |
| 4 | T20 | Bernadett Biacsi | Hungary | 4:41.78 | |
| 5 | T20 | Liudmyla Danylina | Ukraine | 4:43.31 | SB |
| 6 | T20 | Iryna Kandyba | Ukraine | 4:46.09 | SB |
| 7 | T20 | Cátia Almeida | Portugal | 4:48.54 | SB |

=== T54 ===
Final

| Rank | Sport Class | Name | Nationality | Time | Notes |
|---|---|---|---|---|---|
| 1st place, gold medalist(s) | T54 | Gunilla Wallengren | Sweden | 4:10.26 | |
| 2nd place, silver medalist(s) | T54 | Alexandra Helbling | Switzerland | 4:10.60 | |
| 3rd place, bronze medalist(s) | T54 | Amanda Kotaja | Finland | 4:10.97 | |
| 4 | T54 | Patricia Keller | Switzerland | 4:11.89 | |

== See also ==
- List of IPC world records in athletics
