= 2012 IPC Athletics European Championships – Men's 5000 metres =

The men's 5,000 metres at the 2012 IPC Athletics European Championships was held at Stadskanaal Stadium from 24 to 28 July.

== Medalists ==
Results given by IPC Athletics.

Class	Gold	Silver	Bronze
T11	Ricardo de Pedraza Losa; Spain	Mikael Andersen; Denmark	Igor Khavlin; Russia
T12	Alberto Suarez Laso; Spain	Abel Avila; Spain	Gabriel Macchi; Portugal
T54	Tomasz Hamerlak; Poland	Roger Puigbo Verdaguer; Spain	Ebbe Blichfeldt; Denmark

== Results ==
=== T11 ===
Final

Rank	Sport Class	Name	Nationality	Time	Notes
1st place, gold medalist(s)	T11	Ricardo de Pedraza Losa	Spain	16:43.03	
2nd place, silver medalist(s)	T11	Mikael Andersen	Denmark	16:42.21	SB
3rd place, bronze medalist(s)	T11	Igor Khavlin	Russia	16:55.77	
4	T11	Nuno Alves	Portugal	17:03.64	
5	T11	Carlos Amaral Ferreira	Portugal	17:18.82	SB

=== T12 ===
Final

Rank	Sport Class	Name	Nationality	Time	Notes
1st place, gold medalist(s)	T12	Alberto Suarez Laso	Spain	15:23.60	SB
2nd place, silver medalist(s)	T12	Abel Avila	Spain	16:15.25	SB
3rd place, bronze medalist(s)	T12	Gabriel Macchi	Portugal	16:22.31	
4	T12	Vedran Lozanov	Croatia	17:25.60	

=== T54 ===
Final

Rank	Sport Class	Name	Nationality	Time	Notes
1st place, gold medalist(s)	T54	Tomasz Hamerlak	Poland	12:14.24	
2nd place, silver medalist(s)	T54	Roger Puigbo Verdaguer	Spain	12:15.81	
3rd place, bronze medalist(s)	T54	Ebbe Blichfeldt	Denmark	12:17.51	
4	T54	Ivan Goncharov	Russia	12:57.75	
5	T54	Grigory Murygin	Russia	12:58.47	
—	T54	Alexey Bychenok	Russia	DQ	

== See also ==
- List of IPC world records in athletics
