= Evgenia Trushnikova =

Russian Paralympic athlete (born 1985)

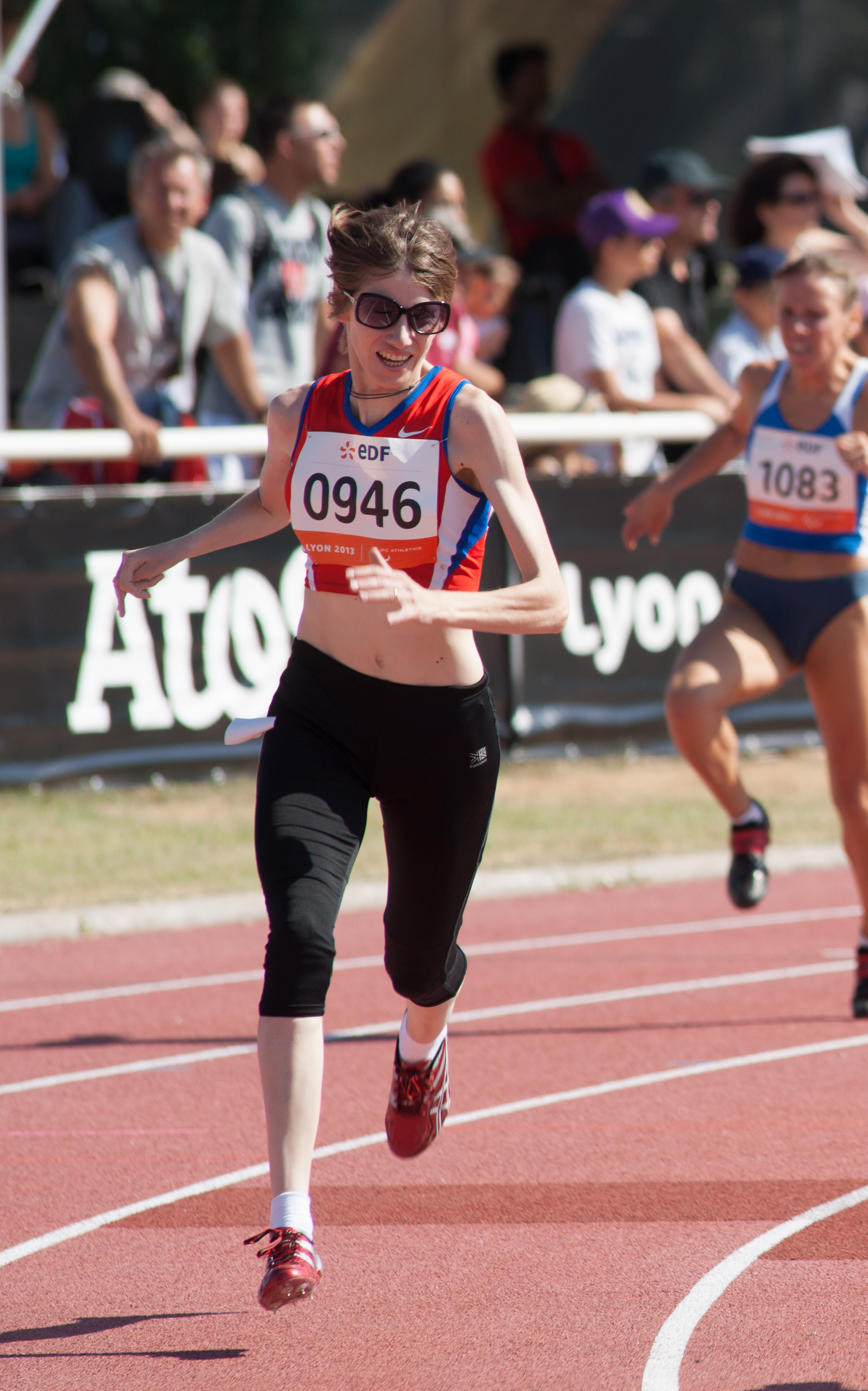
- Trushnikova at the 2013 IPC Athletics World Championships

Personal information
- Nationality: Russian
- Born: 23 February 1985 (age 41) Saratov, Russia

Sport
- Country: Russia
- Sport: Paralympic athletics
- Disability class: T37
- Event: Sprint
- Club: Saratov Regional Sports Centre
- Coached by: Marina Trushnikova
Medal record
Women's para-athletics
Representing Russia
Paralympic Games
Gold medal – first place	2004 Athens	200 metres - T37
Bronze medal – third place	2012 London	400 metres - T37
World Championships
Gold medal – first place	2015 Doha	400m - F37
Bronze medal – third place	2013 Lyon	400m - F37
European Championships
Gold medal – first place	2014 Swansea	400m - F37
Silver medal – second place	2012 Stadskanaal	400m - F37
Bronze medal – third place	2016 Grosseto	400m - F37

Evgenia Trushnikova (born 23 February 1985) is a Paralympian athlete from Russia competing mainly in category T37 sprint events.

== Sporting career ==
Trushnikova competed in the 100m, 200m and 400m in Athens at the 2004 Summer Paralympics winning gold in the 200m. In 2008 she competed in the 100m and 200m without any medal success. At the 2012 Summer Paralympics in London, Trushnikova was back on the podium, taking bronze in her new specialized distance, the 400 metre race.

Outside of the Paralympics, Trushnikova has found success at both the World and European Athletic Championships. In 2014, she won the 400m title at the European Championships in Swansea and the following year she won the 400 m World title at Doha.
