= Egor Sharov =

Russian Paralympic athlete

Personal information
- Nationality: Russian
- Born: 16 December 1988 (age 37) Barnaul, Russia

Sport
- Country: Russia
- Sport: Paralympic athletics
- Disability class: T13
- Event: Middle distance
- Coached by: Sergey Manuylov
Medal record
Event	1st	2nd	3rd
Paralympic Games	0	1	0
World Championships	3	1	0
European Championships	5	0	0
Paralympic athletics
Representing Russia
Paralympic Games
Silver medal – second place	2012 London	800m – T12
IPC World Championships
Gold medal – first place	2013 Lyon	400m – T12
Gold medal – first place	2013 Lyon	800m – T12
Gold medal – first place	2015 Doha	800m – T13
Silver medal – second place	2015 Doha	400m – T13
IPC European Championships
Gold medal – first place	2012 Stadskanaal	800m – T12
Gold medal – first place	2012 Stadskanaal	1,500m – T12
Gold medal – first place	2014 Swansea	400m – T13
Gold medal – first place	2016 Grosseto	400m – T13
Gold medal – first place	2016 Grosseto	800m – T13

Egor Sharov (born 16 December 1988) is a Paralympian athlete from Russia competing mainly in category T13 middle-distance events.
