= Marie Brämer-Skowronek =

German Paralympic athlete (born 1990)

Personal information
- Nationality: German
- Born: 9 December 1990 (age 35) Wolmirstedt, Germany
- Height: 170 cm (67 in)

Sport
- Sport: track and field
- Disability: Cerebral palsy
- Disability class: T34
- Events: Shot put Javelin throw
- Club: LAV Bunde
- Coached by: Alexander Hollstein
Medal record
Women's athletics
Representing Germany
Paralympic Games
Silver medal – second place	2012 London	Javelin - F33/34/52/53
IPC World Championships
Bronze medal – third place	2013 Lyon	Javelin F33/34
IPC European Championships
Bronze medal – third place	2012 Stadskanaal	Javelin F33/34

Marie Brämer-Skowronek (born 9 December 1990) is a German Paralympic athlete competing in F34 classification throwing events. She represented Germany at the 2012 Summer Paralympic Games in London, entering the javelin throw and the shot put. She finished tenth in the shot and in the javelin, which stretched over four classifications, she threw a distance of 20.43 metres to win the silver medal. As well as Paralympic success, she won a bronze medal at the 2013 IPC Athletics World Championships in the javelin.
