= Annalisa Minetti =

Italian singer, politician and athlete (born 1976)

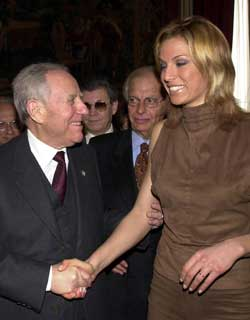
- Minetti with former Italian President Carlo Azeglio Ciampi
- Born: 27 December 1976 (age 49); Rho, Italy
- Education: Università telematica San Raffaele
- Occupations: Singer; songwriter; actress; athlete
- Years active: 1994–present
- Spouses: Gennaro Esposito (m. 2002; div. 2013) Michele Panzarino (m. 2016)
- Children: Fabio Esposito; Elèna Panzarino
- Musical career
- Genres: Pop
- Instrument: Vocals
- Sports career
- Club: Fiamme Azzurre (2012–2015); Fiamme Oro (2015–2019); Fiamme Azzurre (2019-)
Medal record
Paralympic Games
Bronze medal – third place	2012 London	1500m – T12
IPC World Championships
Gold medal – first place	2013 Lyon	800m – T11
IPC European Championships
Bronze medal – third place	2012 Stadskanaal	1500m – T12
- Modeling information
- Height: 180 cm (5 ft 11 in)
- Hair color: Blonde
- Eye color: Green
- Website: www.annalisaminetti.com

Annalisa Minetti (born 27 December 1976) is an Italian singer, politician, Paralympic athlete, Olympic champion and Sanremo Music Festival winner.

Minetti was a beauty pageant contestant in the 1997 edition of Miss Italia; she gained public attention because she was the first blind woman admitted to the competition. She placed in 7th position and won the title of Miss Gambissime (Miss Super Legs).

== Sanremo Music Festival ==
At age 15, helped by her uncle, she took the first steps into the music scene, singing in piano bars covers of Prince, Ray Charles, Celine Dion and Aretha Franklin, her favourite artist. In 1998, she won the 48th edition of the Sanremo Music Festival with the song Senza te o con te.

== Paralympic Games ==
As a para-sport athlete, Minetti competes in the T11 disability classification category. She competed in the 2012 Summer Paralympics in the 1500 metres, but due to there being no T11 race in the schedule, she entered the T12 event. She ended the race in third position but set a new world record for her class, beating the previous record set by Miroslava Sedlackova.

== Personal history ==
In the Italian legislative elections of 2013, Annalisa Minetti was a candidate with the political movement of Mario Monti.
