= Athletics at the 2012 Summer Paralympics – Women's 400 metres T37 =

Women's 400 metres T37 at the XIV Paralympic Games
- Venue: London Olympic Stadium
- Dates: 6 to 8 September
- Competitors: 11 from 7 nations
- Winning time: 1:05.86

Medalists
1st place, gold medalist(s)		Neda Bahi	Tunisia
2nd place, silver medalist(s)		Viktoriya Kravchenko	Ukraine
3rd place, bronze medalist(s)		Evgeniya Trushnikova	Russia

Athletics at the 2012 Summer Paralympics
Classification
T/F11–13: Blind and visually impaired
T/F20: Intellectual disability
T/F31–38: Cerebral palsy
F40: Les Autres
T/F42–46: Amputees
T/F51–58: Spinal cord disability
Men T/F31–38
Track
100 m	T34	T35	T36
T37	T38
200 m	T34	T35	T36
T37	T38
400 m	T36	T38
800 m	T36	T37
1500 m	T37
Field
Long jump	F36	F37-38
Shot put	F32-33	F34
F37-38
Club throw	F31-32/51
Discus throw	F32-34	F35-36
F37-38
Javelin throw	F33-34
Women T/F31–38
Track
100 m	T34	T35	T36
T37	T38
200 m	T34	T35	T36
T37	T38
400 m	T37
4×100 m relay	T35-38
Field
Long jump	F37-38
Shot put	F32-34	F35-36
F37
Club throw	F31-32/51
Discus throw	F35-36	F37
Javelin throw	F33-34/52-53	F37-38

The Women's 400 metres T37 event at the 2012 Summer Paralympics took place at the London Olympic Stadium from 6 to 8 September. The event consisted of 2 heats and a final.

The T37 category is for ambulant athletes with cerebral palsy. These athletes have movement and coordination problems on one half of their body. They have good ability in their dominant side of their body (ie hemiplegia).

== Records ==
Prior to the competition, the existing World and Paralympic records were as follows:

World & Paralympic record	Lisa McIntosh (AUS)	1:04.79	23 October 2000	Sydney, Australia

== Results ==
=== Round 1 ===
Competed 6 September 2012 from 10:44. Qual. rule: first 3 in each heat (Q) plus the 2 fastest other times (q) qualified.

==== Heat 1 ====
Rank	Athlete	Country	Time	Notes
1	Neda Bahi	Tunisia	1:07.49	Q, PB
2	Viktoriya Kravchenko	Ukraine	1:09.66	Q, =SB
3	Anastasiya Ovsyannikova	Russia	1:10.12	Q
4	Jodi Elkington	Australia	1:11.12	q
5	Isabelle Foerder	Germany	1:11.95	q, PB

==== Heat 2 ====
Rank	Athlete	Country	Time	Notes
1	Maryna Snisar	Ukraine	1:08.84	Q
2	Evgeniya Trushnikova	Russia	1:09.30	Q
3	Maike Hausberger	Germany	1:10.59	Q, PB
4	Mandy Francois-Elie	France	1:16.29	
5	Leah Robinson	Canada	1:16.94	
6	Maria Seifert	Germany	DNS	

=== Final ===
Competed 8 September 2012 at 11:48.

Rank	Athlete	Country	Time	Notes
1st place, gold medalist(s)	Neda Bahi	Tunisia	1:05.86	RR
2nd place, silver medalist(s)	Viktoriya Kravchenko	Ukraine	1:07.32	RR
3rd place, bronze medalist(s)	Evgeniya Trushnikova	Russia	1:07.35	PB
4	Maryna Snisar	Ukraine	1:08.86	
5	Maike Hausberger	Germany	1:10.45	PB
6	Jodi Elkington	Australia	1:11.49	
7	Isabelle Foerder	Germany	1:13.47	
8	Anastasiya Ovsyannikova	Russia	1:17.28	

Q = qualified by place. q = qualified by time. RR = Regional Record. PB = Personal Best. SB = Seasonal Best. DNS = Did not start.
