= Isidro Vildosola =

Filipino para-athlete

Personal information
- Nickname: Sid
- Home town: Koronadal, South Cotabato

Sport
- Country: Philippines
- Sport: Para-athletics
- Disability class: T46
- Team: Wetshop Para-Tri Team (Triathlon)
Medal record
Men's para athletics
Representing Philippines
Asian Para Games
Silver medal – second place	2010 Guangzhou	T46 1,500m

Isidro Vildosola is a Filipino para-athlete who competed in the 2012 Summer Paralympics in London.

== Background ==
A native of Koronadal, South Cotabato, Vildosola lost his right arm as a boy in 1999 at a rice mill in Marbel, South Cotabato after he saved the life of a cousin whose malong gut stuck in a grinding machinery. After the incident, his father disowned him. Isidro was left with his mother. In high school, he was able to excel against able-bodied competitors in a varsity meet which helped him secure athletic scholarship at the University of Southern Mindanao. He viewed Eduardo Buenavista as his running idol.

Vildosola's participation in the 2005 Milo Marathon National Finals led him to an opportunity to represent the Philippines in international competitions. Since then he have competed in the ASEAN Para Games and Asian Para Games. When training he focus on conditioning his amputated right appendage to counter the lack of balance caused by his disability. He also competed for his country in the 2012 Summer Paralympics in London.

In triathlon, Vildosola was part of the Wetshop Para-Tri team. He also competed in the 2015 IPC Athletics World Championships, which was part of the 2015 London Marathon.
