= Rafał Korc =

Polish Paralympic athlete (born 1982)

Rafal Korc
Personal information
- Nationality: Polish
- Born: 9 March 1982 (age 44) Warsaw, Poland

Sport
- Country: Poland
- Sport: Track and field
- Disability class: (T20)
- Event: middle-distance running
- Club: START Otwock
- Coached by: Bozena Dziubinska (club); Zbigniew Lewkowicz (national)
Medal record
Paralympic athletics
Representing Poland
Paralympic Games
Bronze medal – third place	2012 London	1500 m – F20
IPC European Championships
Gold medal – first place	2016 Grosseto	1500m T20
Bronze medal – third place	2016 Grosseto	1500m T20

Rafal Korc (born 9 March 1982) is a Paralympic athlete from Poland who competes in T20 classification middle-distance running events. Korc represented Poland at the 2012 Summer Paralympics in London, where he won bronze in the 1500 m race. He has been selected for three IPC Athletics World Championships, but he has been unable to replicate his Paralympic Games success, with his best finish being 5th at the 2013 Games in Lyon.
