= Oğuz Akbulut =

Turkish Paralympic athlete (born 1992)

Personal information
- Born: 6 May 1992 (age 34) Sivas, Turkey

Sport
- Country: Turkey
- Sport: Paralympic athletics
- Disability class: T12, T13
- Events: 400m, 800m
Medal record
Track and field
Representing Turkey
World Championships
Silver medal – second place	2025 New Delhi	400m T12
Bronze medal – third place	2019 Dubai	400m T12
Bronze medal – third place	2023 Paris	400m T12
European Championships
Gold medal – first place	2018 Berlin	400m T12
Bronze medal – third place	2017 London	400m T12
Bronze medal – third place	2012 Stadskanaal	800m T13
Islamic Solidarity Games
Bronze medal – third place	2017 Baku	400m B2-B3

Oğuz Akbulut (born 6 May 1992) is a Turkish Paralympian athlete competing in the T12 and T13 disability classes sprint and middle-distance events.

== Personal life ==
Akbulut was born in Sivas, Turkey on 6 May 1992. He had sight loss rom birth.

He is married to middle-distance visual-impaired para-athlete Oznur Alumur.

== Sport career ==
Akbulut was admitted to the Turkey national team in 2012. He participated at the 2012 IPC Athletics European Championships held in Stadskanaal, Netherlands, and won the bronze medal in the 800m T13 evemt. His participation in the 1500m T13 (4th place) and 5000m T13 (5th place) events at the 2014 IPC Athletics European Championships in Swansea, Wales remained without a medal. He won the bronze medal in the 400m B2-B3 event at the 2017 Islamic Solidarity Games in Baku, Azerbaijan. He became bronze medalist in the 400m T12 event at the 2017 World Para Athletics Championships in London, United Kingdom. At the 2018 World Para Athletics European Championships in Berlin, Germany, he took the gold medal in the 400m T12 event, and set a championship record with 49.92. He won the bronze medal in the 400m T12 event at the 2019 World Para Athletics Championships in Dubai, United Arab Emirates.

He qualified to compete in the 400m T12 event at the 2020 Summer Paralympics.
