= Claire Williams (athlete) =

British paralympian athlete

Personal information
- Full name: Claire Williams
- Nationality: British
- Born: 29 September 1987 (age 38) Carmarthen, Wales

Sport
- Country: Great Britain
- Sport: Athletics
- Event: F12 Discus
- Club: Carmarthen and District Harriers

Achievements and titles
- Paralympic finals: 2004; 2008; 2012
- Personal best: Discus: 43.15m
Medal record
Representing Great Britain
Athletics
Paralympic Games
| Bronze medal – third place | 2012 London | Discus throw – F11/12 |
European Games
| Bronze medal – third place | 2012 Stadskanaal | Discus Throw – F11/12 |

Claire Williams (born 29 September 1987) is a Paralympian athlete from Wales competing mainly in category T12 throwing events. She has qualified as a member of the Great Britain team in three Paralympic Games, in 2004 at Athens, 2008 at Beijing and London 2012. At London she took the bronze medal in the discus.

== Career history ==
Williams was born in Carmarthen, Wales in 1987. Williams, who has a visual impairment, became interested in sport while a school girl, taking up jujitsu. At the age of 12 she switched to athletics, becoming Welsh Schools Champion for hammer and discus. She was educated at Ysgol Bro Myrddin and was part of Carmarthen harriers.

In 2004, at the age of 17, Williams was selected for the Great Britain team for the 2004 Summer Paralympics in Athens. She threw a personal best of 35.26m in the T12 discus, coming in fifth. After Athens Williams continued her athletics training and also matriculated to Loughborough University, completing her degree in psychology in 2007. With her studies over, Williams started competing further afield, and recorded a personal best of 36.78m at Loughborough, which gave her another place in the Great Britain team in the 2008 Summer Paralympics in Beijing. She again came fifth, throwing a distance of 35.01.

In 2009, she came first in the discus at both the Czech and Welsh Opens, and at Loughborough in May she threw a new personal best of 40.30, the first time she had thrown over 40 metres competitively. Williams was back in the Great Britain team in January 2011, chosen to compete in the 2011 IPC Athletics World Championships in Christchurch, New Zealand. A throw of 37.19m gave her another 5th placing in an international competition. Between May and July 2011, Williams threw over 40m in four different competitions, including a personal best of 43.15 at Loughborough.

Williams made the Great Britain team for the third time when she was selected for the 2012 Summer Olympics in London. A series of injuries going into the games, along with a self-perceived loss of form, saw Williams going into the games doubting her own ability at gaining a podium finish. In the run up to the Games she participated in the European Championships taking the bronze medal in the discus. On 1 September at the 2012 Summer Paralympics she took part in the F11–12 discus event and threw 39.63 m which converted to 908 pts, and was enough to give Williams her first Paralympic medal, a bronze.

== Personal life ==
Williams' lives in Carmarthen and has two children.
