= Ebbe Blichfeldt =

Danish wheelchair racer

Ebbe Blichfeldt is a Danish wheelchair racer living in Switzerland who has competed internationally in the Paralympic Games and other para-athletic events, in the T54 classification for athletes with spinal cord injuries who compete in wheelchairs. He also works as an occupational therapist.

Blichfeldt was paralysed at age 13 as a side effect of cancer, and began wheelchair racing in 2001. His competitions have included competing for Denmark at the 2008 Summer Paralympics, and for Denmark at the 2016 Summer Paralympics, where he qualified as the only Danish wheelchair racer, and earned big cheers from the crowd despite finishing last in his heat in the 5000m race. He placed third in the wheelchair category of the Dublin Marathon in 2018, and second in the 2018 Rome Marathon. He has held the Danish records for 1500m and 5000m wheelchair racing.

Blichfeldt moved to Switzerland in 2009, and trains at the Swiss Paraplegic Centre in Nottwil along with other parathletes including champion wheelchair racer Marcel Hug. He is sponsored by OA Opbyg A/S, an axle construction firm in Karlslunde.

== Results ==
Blichfeldt's events and results include:

- 2003 London Marathon: 10th
- 2008 Summer Paralympics: 1500m: 35th; 5000m: 25th; marathon: 28th
- 2011 IPC Athletics World Championships: 1500m: 25th; marathon: 18th
- 2012 IPC Athletics European Championships: 1500m: 5th; 5000m: bronze medal
- 2014 IPC Athletics European Championships: 1500m: DNF; 5000m: 7th
- 2015 London Marathon: 16th
- 2015 IPC Athletics World Championships: marathon: 16th
- 2016 Summer Paralympics: 1500m: 8th in heat; 5000m: 9th in heat
- 2018 Rome Marathon: silver medal
- 2018 Dublin Marathon: bronze medal
