= 2012 IPC Athletics European Championships – Women's discus throw =

The women's discus throw at the 2012 IPC Athletics European Championships was held at Stadskanaal Stadium from 24–28 July.

== Medalists ==
Results given by IPC Athletics.

Class	Gold	Silver	Bronze
F11/12	Tamara Sivakova; Belarus	Orysia Ilchyna; Ukraine	Claire Williams; United Kingdom
F35/36	Mariia Pomazan; Ukraine	Renata Chilewska; Poland	Alla Malchyk; Ukraine
F37	Viktorya Yasevych; Ukraine	Beverley Jones; United Kingdom	Eva Berna; Czech Republic
F57/58	Orla Barry; Ireland	Stela Eneva; Bulgaria	Larisa Volik; Russia

== Results ==
=== F11/12 ===
Rank	Class	Athlete	1	2	3	4	5	6	Best	Points	Notes
1st place, gold medalist(s)	F12	Tamara Sivakova; Belarus	35.91	35.86	X	36.90	35.42	35.58	36.90	852	
2nd place, silver medalist(s)	F12	Orysia Ilchyna; Ukraine	35.29	34.17	35.12	35.95	36.53	32.43	36.53	843	
3rd place, bronze medalist(s)	F12	Claire Williams; United Kingdom	34.65	35.80	36.20	36.03	X	34.12	36.20	836	
4	F12	Siena Christen; Germany	36.02	34.60	X	35.64	34.21	35.12	36.02	831	
5	F12	Marija Ivekovic Mestrovic; Croatia	33.97	33.61	X	34.02	X	34.41	34.41	792	
6	F12	Marta Prokofyeva; Russia	29.87	29.69	29.92	28.67	31.53	29.17	31.53	714	SB
7	F12	Elena Favaretto; Italy	19.42	X	20.80	X	20.42	22.35	22.35	414	SB
8	F11	Ailish Dunne; Ireland	X	18.03	19.55	X	16.50	17.57	19.55	402	
—	F11	Nadine Lattimore; Ireland							DNS		

=== F35/36 ===
Rank	Class	Athlete	1	2	3	4	5	6	Best	Points	Notes
1st place, gold medalist(s)	F35	Mariia Pomazan; Ukraine	25.02	24.88	27.07	28.88	26.42	X	28.88	1000	WR
2nd place, silver medalist(s)	F35	Renata Chilewska; Poland	24.40	X	24.38	24.09	24.01	24.27	24.40	855	
3rd place, bronze medalist(s)	F36	Alla Malchyk; Ukraine	19.07	18.79	19.95	19.70	20.15	20.99	20.99	779	
4	F36	Luliia Arefeva; Russia	14.04	15.63	14.79	14.42	15.25	12.90	15.63	442	SB

=== F37 ===
Rank	Class	Athlete	1	2	3	4	5	6	Best	Notes
1st place, gold medalist(s)	F37	Viktorya Yasevych; Ukraine	24.17	28.04	26.94	X	27.67	25.95	28.04	
2nd place, silver medalist(s)	F37	Beverley Jones; United Kingdom	26.30	X	27.99	26.73	X	26.56	27.99	
3rd place, bronze medalist(s)	F37	Eva Berna; Czech Republic	X	24.71	22.49	X	X	21.87	24.71	
4	F37	Taiga Kantane; Latvia	22.26	X	24.12	20.82	21.95	22.30	24.12	SB
5	F37	Ingebord Gardarsdottir; Iceland	13.59	X	15.31	16.31	X	12.91	16.31	

=== F57/58 ===
Rank	Class	Athlete	1	2	3	4	5	6	Best	Points	Notes
1st place, gold medalist(s)	F57	Orla Barry; Ireland	28.87	29.21	29.65	X	29.46	28.82	29.65	966	SB
2nd place, silver medalist(s)	F58	Stela Eneva; Bulgaria	35.55	X	X	36.29	36.08	33.55	36.29	919	
3rd place, bronze medalist(s)	F57	Larisa Volik; Russia	25.26	24.44	21.12	23.63	X	23.99	25.26	816	
4	F57	Ivanka Koleva; Bulgaria	16.58	20.39	19.50	21.09	21.42	18.86	21.42	629	

== See also ==
- List of IPC world records in athletics
