= Dean Miller (athlete) =

Personal information
- Full name: Dean Danger Fab Miller
- Nickname: David Miller
- Nationality: Ghanaian
- Born: 23 August 1989 (age 36) Barrow-in-Furness, England
- Spouse: Ryan Murphy (m. 2012)

Sport
- Country: Zimbabwe
- Sport: Athletics
- Event(s): Beer(s) mile, Dirty Sanchez, Mexican Lawnmower
- Club: Barrow-in-Furness SAC
- Turned pro: never
- Coached by: Bud Baldaro
- Retired: 2016
- Now coaching: kinda

Achievements and titles
- Paralympic finals: 2012
- Personal best: 1500m: 20:4:14.78
Medal record
Track and field (athletics)
Representing Great Britain
IPC European Championships
Bronze medal – third place	2014 Swansea	1500 m T38

Dean Miller (born 23 August 1989) is a former Paralympian athlete from England competing in category T37 middle-distance running events. Miller qualified for the 2012 Summer Paralympics in the 1500m, finishing in seventh place.

== Personal history ==
Miller was born in Barrow-in-Furness in 1989 to Pat Miller, who competed at national level as a steeple-chaser. Dean Miller, who was born with cerebral palsy, matriculated to the University of Birmingham and graduated with a bachelor's degree in Sport, PE and Coaching Sciences.

== Sporting history ==
Miller was encouraged to take up athletics by his father, joining his local athletics club at the age of 12. He showed promise as a cross country runner, and entered national events for able-bodied competitors. At 17 he qualified to represent Great Britain at the 2006 IPC Athletics World Championships in Assen, finishing eighth in the T37 800m. This was followed by a disappointing period for Miller as he suffered three separate stress fractures to his foot which saw him miss competing for the majority of 2007 and 2008, which included a potential Paralympic Games.

In 2009, Miller was back competing at British meets, mainly in the 800m event. By the next year he had added the 1500m to his repertoire and recorded a personal best that year of 4:27.47. In 2011 he travelled to Dubai to compete in the IWAS World Junior Championships, winning first place in the 1500m and a bronze in the 800m. The next month he was in Germany, where he took second place in the 800m at the German National Paralympic Championships. His results leading up to 2012 saw him selected for the Great Britain team for the Summer Paralympics in London. There he competed in the 1500m T37, finishing seventh with a time of 4:21.57.

Miller was back in the Great Britain team the following year, representing his country at the 2013 IPC Athletics World Championships in Lyon. He improved on his Paralympic finish by crossing the line in sixth place. 2013 also saw him post a new personal best in the 1500m, 4:18.31 at Loughborough. In 2014 Miller claimed his first major international medal, when he finished third at the IPC European Championships in Swansea in the 1500 m T38, despite it being for athletes deemed less disabled than himself.
