= Anastasiya Ovsyannikova =

Russian Paralympic athlete

Personal information
- Born: 20 October 1988 (age 37) Sterlitamak, Russia

Sport
- Country: Russia
- Sport: Athletics
- Disability class: T37
- Event: sprint
- Coached by: Tatiana Shchepetilnikova
Medal record
Track and field (T36)
Representing Russia
Paralympic Games
Gold medal – first place	2012 London	100m relay – T35–38
World Championships
Silver medal – second place	2011 Christchurch	100m relay – T35–38
Bronze medal – third place	2011 Christchurch	400m – T37
European Championships
Gold medal – first place	2012 Stadskanaal	100m relay – T35–38
Bronze medal – third place	2012 Stadskanaal	400m – F37

Anastasiya Anatolyevna Ovsyannikova (Russian: Анастаси́я Анатольевна Овся́нникова; born 20 October 1988) is a Paralympian athlete from Russia competing mainly in category T36 sprint events.

== Athletics career ==
Ovsyannikova competed at the 2012 Summer Paralympics in London, where she won a gold medal as part of the women's T35–38 100m sprint relay. As well as her Paralympic success Ovsyannikova won two medals at the 2011 World Championships in Christchurch. A silver as part of the Russian relay team and an individual bronze in the 400 metres. She took time away from athletics after the birth of her son in 2013, and has not appeared at a major international competition since.

== Personal history ==
Ovsyannikova was born in Sterlitamak in the former Soviet Union in 1988. Ovsyannikova was educated at Bashkir Institute of Physical Culture. She is married and gave birth to a son in 2013.
