= 2015 London Marathon =

35th annual marathon race in London

35th London Marathon
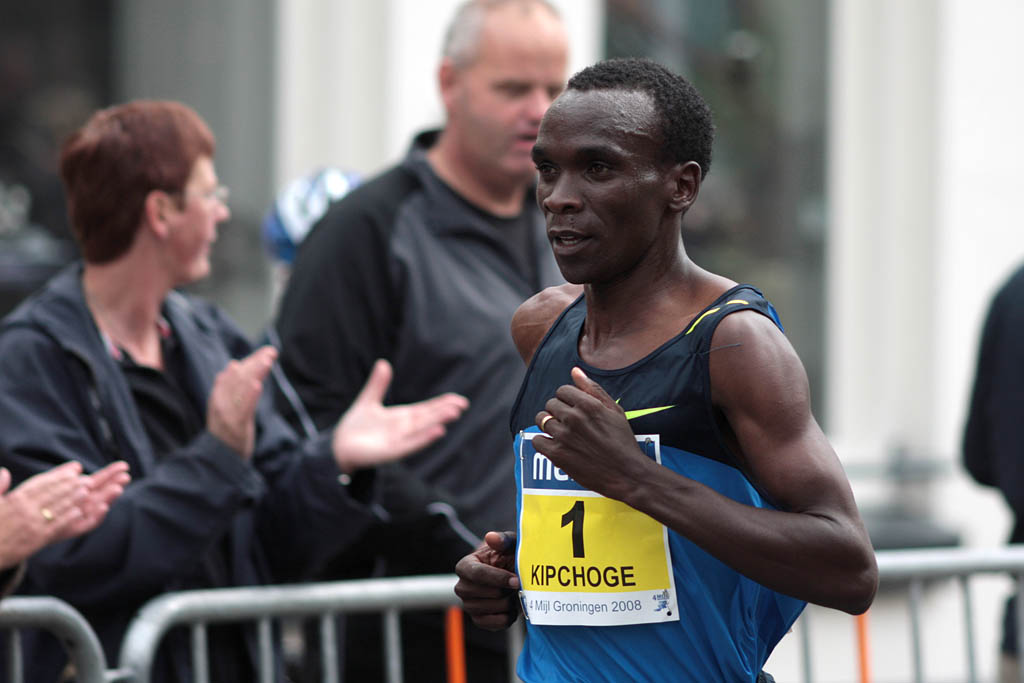
- Men's winner Eliud Kipchoge
- Venue: London, England
- Date: 26 April 2015

Champions
- Men: Eliud Kipchoge (2:04:42)
- Women: Tigist Tufa (2:23:21)
- Wheelchair men: Josh George (1:31:31)
- Wheelchair women: Tatyana McFadden (1:41:13)

The 2015 London Marathon was the 35th running of the annual marathon race in London, England, which took place on Sunday, 26 April. The men's elite race was won by Kenyan Eliud Kipchoge and the women's race was won by Ethiopian Tigist Tufa. The 2015 IPC Athletics World Championships marathon events were also held during the race. The men's wheelchair race was won by Josh George from the United States and the women's wheelchair race was won by American Tatyana McFadden. McFadden set a course record for the second year running.

Around 172,888 people applied to enter the race: 51,696 had their applications accepted and 38,020 started the race. These were all record highs for the race. A total of 37,581 runners, 23,208 men and 14,373 women, finished the race.

In the under-17 Mini Marathon, the 3-mile able-bodied and wheelchair events were won by Ben Dijkstra (14:00), Harriet Knowles-Jones (16:07), Nathan Maguire (11:35) and Kare Adenegan (12:41).

== Field ==
The 2015 men's elite field was dubbed the "clash of the champions" by race organizers due to an unusually large number of top competitors. Eight men in the field had recorded a sub-2:05 race in their career, the three fastest marathoners ever, and five of the top 10 all-time were among those competing.

British runner Paula Radcliffe, who holds the women's marathon world record, chose to compete in the mass field instead of the elite field. Before the race, she stated that it would be her final competition. Earlier in the year, she was suffering from an Achilles tendon injury which gave her limited training time before the marathon.

Approximately 38,000 people took part in the race overall, many of them raising money for charity. Competitors ranged in age from 18 to 90.

Celebrities taking part in the London Marathon included: Formula One driver Jenson Button, former MotoGP and Superbike rider James Toseland and rowing Olympic gold medalist James Cracknell who were raising money for Cancer Research UK and a brain injury charity called Headway respectively, the BBC Radio 2 presenter Chris Evans, fashion designer Henry Holland, actor Oliver Proudlock and model Christy Turlington Burns. Five members of the House of Commons members took part: Alun Cairns, Richard Drax, Graham Evans, Dan Jarvis and Edward Timpson as did Governor of the Bank of England Mark Carney.

Among those competing in the three-mile children's course was David and Victoria Beckham's son Romeo. According to the family, Romeo's run raised £6,000 for UNAIDS.

== Race description ==
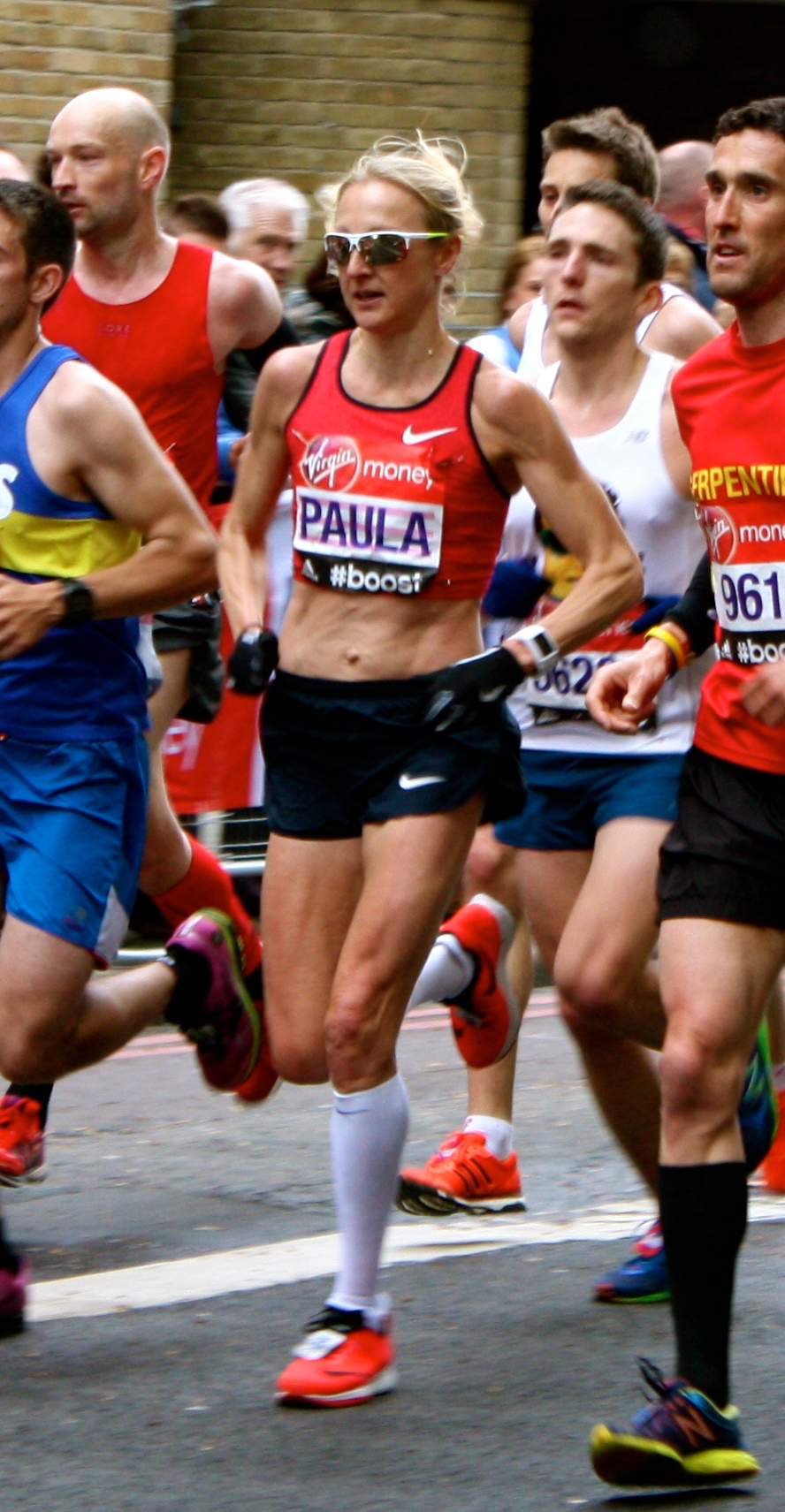
Paula Radcliffe during the marathon

On race day, conditions were overcast with light rain in places. The temperature was mildly cold, decent for running. An estimated 750,000 fans lined the streets of London to watch the race live.

The men's race got off to a fast start, covering the first three miles in 14 minutes, 31 seconds. From there the pace periodically sped up and slowed down as racers considered their strategies. After ten miles, it appeared that the course record of 2:04:29 was within reach. After the race passed Tower Bridge, the lead group contained ten runners. By the 19-mile mark, it was cut to six as defending champion Wilson Kipsang of Kenya pushed the pace. With four miles to go, the lead group was down to four competitors, all from Kenya: Eliud Kipchoge, Stanley Biwott, Kipsang, and world record holder Dennis Kimetto.

Kipsang and Kipchoge broke free of the others as they approached the 24-mile mark. The two remained close until Kipchoge pulled away in the final 800 metres. Kipchoge finished in a time of 2 hours, 4 minutes, 42 seconds for his first London Marathon victory. Previously, he won the Chicago and Rotterdam Marathons in 2014. "It was a tough race," he commented. "My training paid off and it went to plan. The crowd were wonderful and lifted me for my sprint finish." Kipsang finished five seconds back for second place. Kimetto placed third, more than a minute behind the leaders. Biwott finished fourth to complete a top four sweep by Kenya.

In the women's race, the pace was slow. Tigist Tufa of Ethiopia used a late surge to distance herself from the field, finishing in a time of 2 hours, 23 minutes, 22 seconds. It was just the second time an Ethiopian woman won the London Marathon, after Derartu Tulu won the 2001 London Marathon, and ended a four-year winning streak for Kenya. It was Tufa's first major marathon win. "The weather was very difficult for me and I found it a very slow race until the end", she said. "I was unwell at the end but I am very happy that I am OK now. I've always dreamed about winning the London Marathon." Two-time winner and pre-race favourite Mary Keitany of Kenya finished in second place, 18 seconds behind Tufa. Tirfi Tsegaye of Ethiopia placed third. Radcliffe finished in a time a 2:36:55. She called the race very emotional and remarked "It was so loud, my ears were ringing. It was just amazing the whole way round. All the way along, there were so many people giving me encouragement."

A total of 37,675 racers had completed the course by 6:10 pm, eclipsing the record of 36,705 set in 2012. Guinness World Records reported that more than 30 records were broken during the race for things such as "fastest marathon dressed as Spiderman." Two competitors wed midway through the race. Prince Harry presented the winners with their medals. Radcliffe received a lifetime achievement award.

=== IPC World Marathon Championships ===
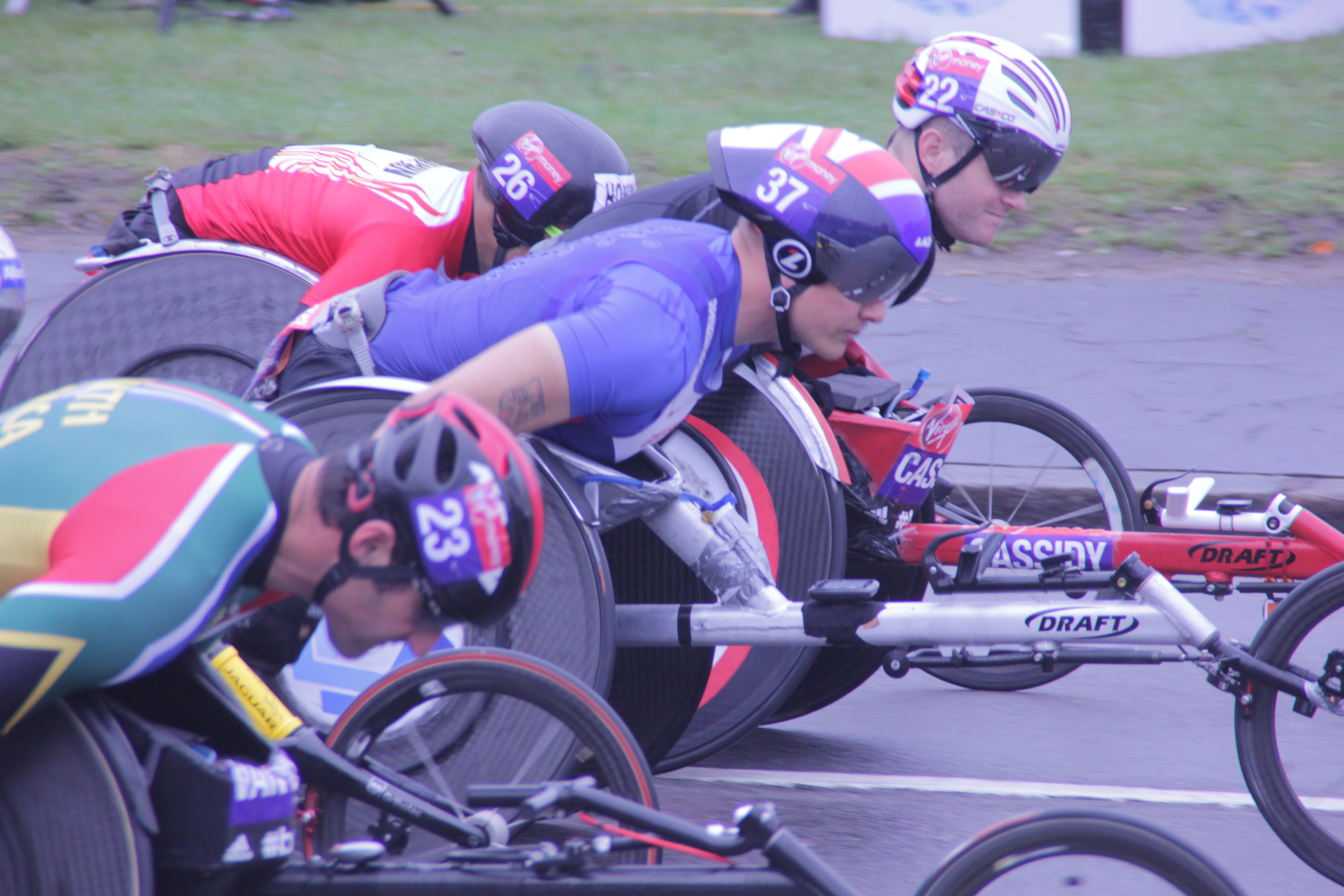
Elite wheelchair competitors at the start of the race: David Weir (37) 2nd, Josh Cassidy (22), Ernst van Dyk (23) 5th, Kota Hokinoue (26) 7th

Britain's David Weir was attempting to win a record seventh London Marathon title in the men's wheelchair race. After Marcel Hug withdrew from the race midway with a punctured tyre, Weir and American Josh George battled for the lead. Weir appeared to have the advantage in the final straightaway, but George nipped him at the line. George finished in a time of 1:31:31, one second ahead of Weir. Masazumi Soejima of Japan placed third. It was George's first London Marathon title.

American Tatyana McFadden won the women's race for the third consecutive year. Her time of 1:41:13 beat her own course record set in 2014 by nearly four minutes. It was the third time that McFadden had set a course record in London and it was her first global marathon title. The defending World Champion Manuela Schär finished almost three minutes behind in second.

El Amin Chentouf, Abderrahman Ait Khamouch and Elena Pautova set world records in the men's T12, men's T46, and women's T12 categories respectively.

== Results ==
=== Men ===
Position	Athlete	Nationality	Time
1st place, gold medalist(s)	Eliud Kipchoge	Kenya	2:04:42
2nd place, silver medalist(s)	Wilson Kipsang Kiprotich	Kenya	2:04:47
3rd place, bronze medalist(s)	Dennis Kipruto Kimetto	Kenya	2:05:50
4	Stanley Biwott	Kenya	2:06:41
5	Tilahun Regassa	Ethiopia	2:07:16
6	Sammy Kitwara	Kenya	2:07:43
7	Javier Guerra	Spain	2:09:33
8	Ghebrezgiabhier Kibrom	Eritrea	2:09:36
9	Aleksey Reunkov	Russia	2:10:10
10	Serhiy Lebid	Ukraine	2:10:21
11	Emmanuel Kipchirchir Mutai	Kenya	2:10:54
12	Michael Shelley	Australia	2:11:19
13	Scott Overall	United Kingdom	2:13:13
14	Anuradha Cooray	Sri Lanka	2:13:47
15	Koen Raymaekers	Netherlands	2:14:25
16	Hermano Ferreira	Portugal	2:15:53
17	Matthew Hynes	United Kingdom	2:16:00
18	Bekir Karayel	Turkey	2:16:06
19	Christian Kreienbühl	Switzerland	2:17:00
20	Aaron Scott	United Kingdom	2:20:49
—	Geoffrey Mutai	Kenya	DNF
—	Tsegaye Mekonnen	Ethiopia	DNF
—	Samuel Tsegay	Eritrea	DNF
—	Wilfred Kipkosgei	Kenya	DNF
—	Edwin Kipyego	Kenya	DNF
—	Wilfred Kirwa Kigen	Kenya	DNF
—	Kadengoi Loitareng	Kenya	DNF

=== Women ===
Position	Athlete	Nationality	Time
1st place, gold medalist(s)	Tigist Tufa	Ethiopia	2:23:22
2nd place, silver medalist(s)	Mary Jepkosgei Keitany	Kenya	2:23:40
3rd place, bronze medalist(s)	Tirfi Tsegaye	Ethiopia	2:23:41
4	Aselefech Mergia	Ethiopia	2:23:53
5	Florence Kiplagat	Kenya	2:24:15
6	Jemima Sumgong	Kenya	2:24:23
7	Priscah Jeptoo	Kenya	2:25:01
8	Ana Dulce Félix	Portugal	2:25:15
9	Volha Mazuronak	Belarus	2:25:36
10	Edna Kiplagat	Kenya	2:27:16
11	Iwona Lewandowska	Poland	2:27:47
12	Diane Nukuri	Burundi	2:27:50
13	Tatyana Petrova Arkhipova	Russia	2:28:42
14	Alessandra Aguilar	Spain	2:29:45
15	Sonia Samuels	United Kingdom	2:31:46
16	Mary Davies	New Zealand	2:34:22
17	Emma Stepto	United Kingdom	2:35:41
18	Rebecca Robinson	United Kingdom	2:36:51
—	Tetyana Hamera-Shmyrko	Ukraine	DQ
—	Rkia El Moukim	Morocco	DQ
—	Elvan Abeylegesse	Turkey	DNF
—	Rebecca Chesire	Kenya	DNF
—	Peres Jepchirchir	Kenya	DNF
—	Elizeba Cherono	Kenya	DNF
—	Susan Partridge	United Kingdom	DNF

=== Wheelchair men ===
Position	Athlete	Nationality	Time
1st place, gold medalist(s)	Josh George	United States	1:31:31
2nd place, silver medalist(s)	David Weir	United Kingdom	1:31:32
3rd place, bronze medalist(s)	Masazumi Soejima	Japan	1:31:33
4	Pierre Fairbank	France	1:31:33
5	Ernst van Dyk	South Africa	1:31:33
6	Tomasz Hamerlak	Poland	1:31:56
7	Kota Hokinoue	Japan	1:32:22
8	Jordi Madera	Spain	1:33:22
9	Heinz Frei	Switzerland	1:33:23
10	Simon Lawson	United Kingdom	1:34:21
11	Ryota Yoshida	Japan	1:35:35
12	Alhassane Baldé	Germany	1:38:31
13	Tobias Loetscher	Switzerland	1:38:32
14	Laurens Molina	Costa Rica	1:38:32
15	Denis Lemeunier	France	1:38:33
16	Ebbe Blichfeldt	Denmark	1:38:34
17	Hiroki Nishida	Japan	1:41:48
18	Hiroyuki Yamamoto	Japan	1:43:29
19	Choke Yasuoka	Japan	1:43:44
20	Alexey Bychenok	Russia	1:46:06

=== Wheelchair women ===
Position	Athlete	Nationality	Time
1st place, gold medalist(s)	Tatyana McFadden	United States	1:41:14
2nd place, silver medalist(s)	Manuela Schär	Switzerland	1:43:56
3rd place, bronze medalist(s)	Amanda McGrory	United States	1:46:25
4	Sandra Graf	Switzerland	1:46:27
5	Susannah Scaroni	United States	1:47:06
6	Christie Dawes	Australia	1:56:20
7	Wakako Tsuchida	Japan	1:56:48
8	Chelsea McClammer	United States	2:02:31
9	Sarah Piercy	United Kingdom	2:20:45
10	Martyna Snopek	United Kingdom	2:26:40
