= 2012 IPC Athletics European Championships – Women's club throw =

The women's club throw at the 2012 IPC Athletics European Championships was held at Stadskanaal Stadium from 24 to 28 July.

== Medalists ==
Results given by IPC Athletics.

Class	Gold	Silver	Bronze
F31/32/51	Maria Stamatoula; Greece	Catherine O'Neill; Ireland	Vendula Pisarikova; Czech Republic

== See also ==
- List of IPC world records in athletics
