= Tigist Tufa =

Ethiopian marathon runner

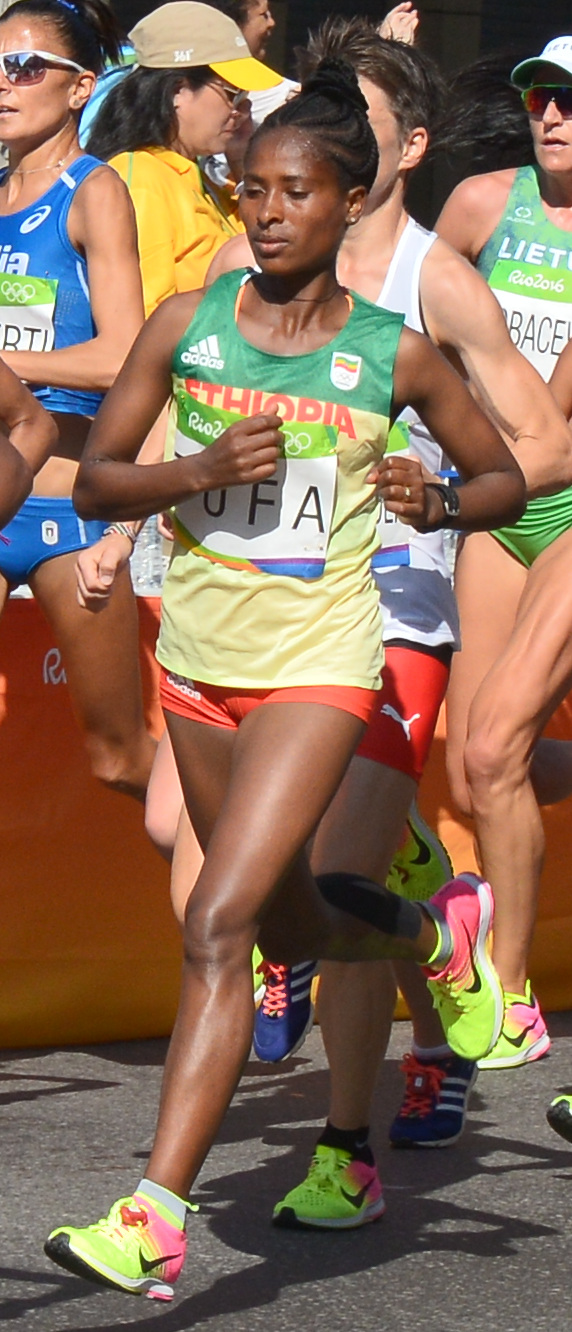
- Tufa at the 2016 Olympics

Personal information
- Nationality: Ethiopian
- Born: 26 January 1987 (age 39)

Sport
- Country: Ethiopia
- Sport: Athletics
- Event: Marathon

Achievements and titles
- Personal best: Marathon: 2:21:52 (2014)
- Updated on 26 April 2015

Tigist Tufa (born 26 January 1987) is an Ethiopian marathon runner.

She was the winner of the 2014 Shanghai Marathon, setting a new course record and a personal best time of 2:21:52. Her previous bests were 2:28:04 at the Los Angeles Marathon in 2013, followed by 2:24:32 at the 2014 Ottawa Marathon, where she also set a new course record.

She won the 2015 London Marathon in a time of 2:23:22, making her the first female Ethiopian to win the race in 14 years. The last Ethiopian to win the race was Derartu Tulu in 2001.
