= Luís Gonçalves (sprinter) =

Portuguese Paralympic athlete (born 1987)

Personal information
- Born: October 12, 1987 (age 38) Portalegre, Portugal
- Height: 178 cm (5 ft 10 in)

Sport
- Country: Portugal
- Sport: Athletics
- Disability: Visual impairment
- Disability class: T12
- Event(s): Sprints (100m, 200m, 400m, 4x100m relay)
- Club: Sporting CP
Medal record
Men's athletics
Representing Portugal
Paralympic Games
Silver medal – second place	2008 Beijing	400m T12
Bronze medal – third place	2016 Rio de Janeiro	400m T12
IPC World Championships
Gold medal – first place	2011 Christchurch	400m T12
Gold medal – first place	2015 Doha	400m T12
Silver medal – second place	2011 Christchurch	200m T12
Silver medal – second place	2011 Christchurch	4x100m relay T11–13
IPC European Championships
Gold medal – first place	2012 Stadskanaal	200m T12
Gold medal – first place	2012 Stadskanaal	400m T12
Silver medal – second place	2012 Stadskanaal	4x100m relay T11-13
Silver medal – second place	2014 Swansea	400m T12
Silver medal – second place	2016 Grosseto	4x100m relay T11–13
- Updated on 12 June 2020

Luís Gonçalves (born 12 October 1987) is a Portuguese visually-impaired sprint runner, who competes mainly in category T12 events.

== Career ==
Gonçalves made his senior international debut in 2007 at the IBSA World Championships in São Paulo, Brazil. The following year, he achieved his first major result by winning a silver medal in the men's 400 metres T12 event at the 2008 Summer Paralympics in Beijing, China.

At the 2011 IPC Athletics World Championships in Christchurch, New Zealand, Gonçalves won the 400 metres T12 and consequently his first-ever gold medal. He also secured two silver medals in the 200 metres T12 and 4 × 100 metres relay T11–13 events.

In 2015, Gonçalves won his second 400 metres gold medal at the World Championships in Doha, Qatar. The following year, Gonçalves added a second Paralympic medal to his tally, winning the 400 metres T12 bronze at the 2016 Summer Paralympics in Rio de Janeiro.
