= 2012 IPC Athletics European Championships – Women's javelin throw =

The women's javelin throw at the 2012 IPC Athletics European Championships was held at Stadskanaal Stadium from 24–28 July.

== Medalists ==
Results given by IPC Athletics.

Class	Gold	Silver	Bronze
F12/13 + F37/38	Tanja Dragic; Serbia	Natalija Eder; Austria	Anna Sorokina; Russia
F46	Nataliya Gudkova; Russia	Hollie Arnold; United Kingdom	Laura Darimont; Germany
F52/53/33/34	Birgit Kober; Germany	Marjaana Huovinen; Finland	Marie Brämer-Skowronek; Germany
F54/55/56	Martina Willing; Germany	Daniela Todorova; Bulgaria	Tatjana Majcen; Slovenia
F57/58	Olga Sergienko; Russia	Larisa Volik; Russia	N/A

== Results ==
=== F12/13 + F37/38 ===
Rank	Class	Athlete	1	2	3	4	5	6	Best	Points	Notes
1st place, gold medalist(s)	F12	Tanja Dragic; Serbia	37.85	35.38	37.34	37.60	37.24	X	37.85	998	
2nd place, silver medalist(s)	F12	Natalija Eder; Austria	37.35	35.84	37.41	36.70	35.26	32.17	37.41	993	SB
3rd place, bronze medalist(s)	F12	Anna Sorokina; Russia	X	33.60	X	34.88	34.33	X	34.88	960	SB
4	F12	Marija Vidacek; Croatia	27.33	X	X	X	X	X	27.33	803	
5	F38	Daniela Vratilova; Czech Republic	24.25	21.78	22.08	20.96	X	X	24.25	741	
6	F37	Eva Berna; Czech Republic	19.78	20.10	X	19.36	X	19.03	20.10	596	
7	F12	Rose Welepa; France	19.89	20.14	18.14	X	17.49	19.75	20.14	548	SB
8	F37	Ingebord Gardarsdottir; Iceland	14.48	X	14.12	15.59	15.20	14.78	15.59	386	

=== F52/53/33/34 ===
Rank	Class	Athlete	1	2	3	4	5	6	Best	Points	Notes
1st place, gold medalist(s)	F34	Birgit Kober; Germany	X	X	X	20.97	X	X	20.97	1042	
2nd place, silver medalist(s)	F34	Marjaana Huovinen; Finland	16.75	X	X	19.19	19.46	18.71	19.46	970	SB
3rd place, bronze medalist(s)	F34	Marie Brämer-Skowronek; Germany	18.61	15.59	17.32	17.12	19.30	14.75	19.30	962	
4	F34	Frances Herrmann; Germany	17.52	17.43	17.33	17.44	17.98	X	17.98	888	SB
5	F34	Veronika Doronina; Russia	X	X	X	17.00	X	X	17.00	827	SB
6	F33	Tetyana Yakybchuk; Ukraine	X	10.60	X	X	X	9.99	10.60	590	SB
7	F34	Elena Burdykina; Russia	X	12.60	12.70	X	12.66	X	12.70	514	

=== F46 ===
Rank	Class	Athlete	1	2	3	4	5	6	Best	Notes
1st place, gold medalist(s)	F46	Nataliya Gudkova; Russia	37.99	34.19	38.45	38.46	35.67	35.79	38.46	SB
2nd place, silver medalist(s)	F46	Hollie Arnold; United Kingdom	32.08	34.47	35.54	32.55	32.52	33.99	35.54	SB
3rd place, bronze medalist(s)	F46	Laura Darimont; Germany	31.81	30.37	31.75	31.80	33.08	X	33.08	SB
4	F46	Maria Gramatke; Germany	26.15	28.69	28.32	27.49	29.33	26.53	29.33	

=== F54/55/56 ===
Rank	Class	Athlete	1	2	3	4	5	6	Best	Points	Notes
1st place, gold medalist(s)	F56	Martina Willing; Germany	21.03	21.57	22.07	23.21	22.30	22.75	23.21	978	
2nd place, silver medalist(s)	F55	Daniela Todorova; Bulgaria	18.76	X	18.42	18.07	X	18.93	18.93	863	
3rd place, bronze medalist(s)	F54	Tatjana Majcen; Slovenia	13.83	13.13	13.48	X	X	13.49	13.83	831	
4	F55	Tanja Cerkvenik; Slovenia	X	17.28	X	17.38	17.57	X	17.57	797	
5	F56	Lucyna Kornobys; Poland	15.01	15.79	X	X	X	16.57	16.57	688	
6	F56	Lorraine Regan; Ireland	X	13.56	X	14.15	X	14.45	14.45	553	
7	F55	Carmen Acunto; Italy	12.88	X	13.48	13.23	X	13.50	13.50	541	SB
—	F54	Eva Kacanu; Czech Republic							DNS		

=== F57/58 ===
Rank	Class	Athlete	1	2	3	4	5	6	Best	Points	Notes
1st place, gold medalist(s)	F57	Olga Sergienko; Russia	19.54	X	20.20	20.08	X	X	20.20	836	
2nd place, silver medalist(s)	F57	Larisa Volik; Russia	18.29	X	X	X	18.30	18.91	18.91	772	
3	F57	Ivanka Koleva; Bulgaria	13.68	13.86	15.12	14.43	14.14	14.55	15.12	530	

== See also ==
- List of IPC world records in athletics
