= Gabriel Macchi =

Portuguese Paralympic athlete (born 1975)

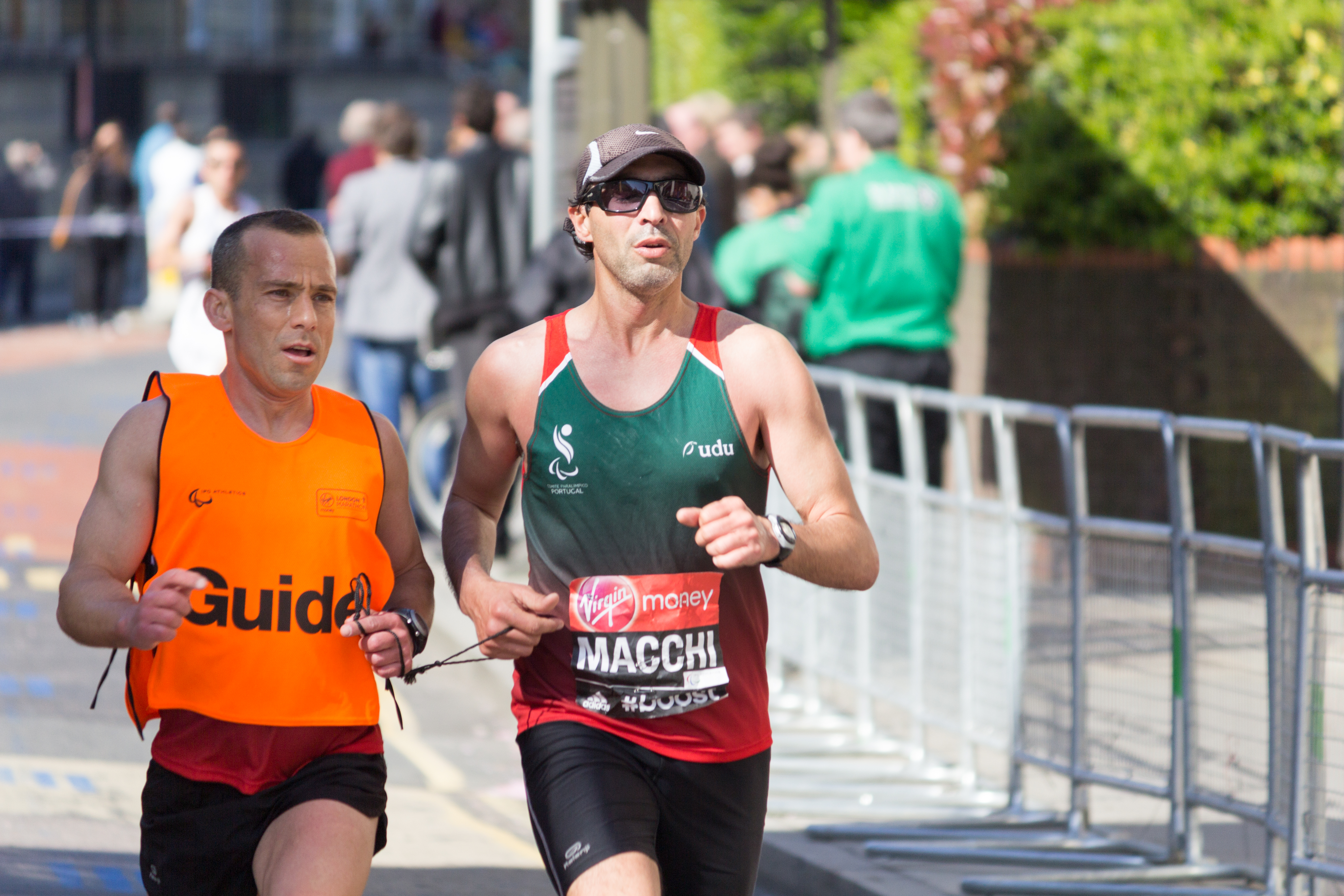
- Macchi at the 2014 London Marathon

Personal information
- Nickname: Gaby
- Nationality: Portuguese
- Born: 2 October 1975 (age 50) Buenos Aires, Argentina
- Height: 175 cm (5 ft 9 in) (2012)
- Weight: 71 kg (157 lb) (2012)

Sport
- Country: Portugal
- Sport: Athletics
- Event(s): 5000m 10000m Marathon

Achievements and titles
- Paralympic finals: 2008 Beijing; 2012 London; 2016 Rio de Janeiro
Medal record
Track and field (athletics)
Representing Portugal
IPC World Championships
Bronze medal – third place	2013 Lyon	Marathon – T12
IPC European Championships
Bronze medal – third place	2012 Stadskanaal	5,000m – T12

Gabriel "Gaby" Macchi (born 2 October 1975) is a Paralympic athlete from Portugal competing mainly in category T12 long-distance events. Macchi has competed in the 2008, 2012 and 2016 Summer Paralympics, and has won medals at both European and World IPC championships.

== Career history ==
Macchi was born in Buenos Aires, Argentina in 1975. He began running at the age of 14 to accompany his father who was a keen marathon competitor. As a youth he was diagnosed with juvenile glaucoma and his eyesight progressively worsened into his adulthood. Macchi began competing in long-distance racing in 2006 and due to his visual impairment was classified as a T12 disability athlete. He impressed enough at country level to be immediately accepted to represent Portugal at the 2006 IPC Athletics World Championships in Assen. There he entered both the 5,000m and 10,000m races, finishing seventh in both. In 2008 he was again selected for the Portuguese team, this time to travel to Beijing to compete in the Summer Paralympics. In Beijing he entered both the 10,000m which he failed to complete, and the joint T11/12 marathon, in which he finished 14th.

In 2011 Macchi travelled to New Zealand to take part in the 2011 IPC Athletics World Championship at Christchurch. There he entered the marathon but he was unable to complete the course. Macchi had better success the following year in the 2012 IPC Athletics European Championships where he came third in the 5,000m, his first major international medal. 2012 also saw Macchi enter his second Paralympic Games, one of three Portuguese competitors in the T12 marathon. Macchi recorded a season's best of 2:40:13 to finish sixth. In his third World Championships, held in Lyon in 2013, he again challenged for the T12 marathon. On this occasion he finished third to take the bronze medal.
