= 2012 IPC Athletics European Championships – Men's 4 × 100 metres relay =

The men's 4x100 metres relay at the 2012 IPC Athletics European Championships was held at the Stadskanaal Stadium from 24 to 29 June.

== Medalists ==
Results given by IPC Athletics.

Class	Gold	Silver	Bronze
T11-13	Yuriy Gornak; Elchin Muradov; Rza Osmanov; Oleg Panyutin; Azerbaijan	Rodolfo Alves; Firmino Baptista; Luis Goncalves; Gabriel Potra; Portugal	Daniel Ayora Estevan; Gerard Desgarrega Puigdevall; Joan Munar Martinez; Martin Parejo Maza; Spain

== Results ==
Rank	Sport Class	Name	Nationality	Time	Notes
1st place, gold medalist(s)	T13; T11; T12; T12	Yuriy Gornak; Elchin Muradov; Rza Osmanov; Oleg Panyutin	Azerbaijan	44.35	
2nd place, silver medalist(s)	T12; T11; T12; TT12	Rodolfo Alves; Firmino Baptista; Luis Goncalves; Gabriel Potra	Portugal	44.89	
3rd place, bronze medalist(s)	T12; T12; T13; T11	Daniel Ayora Estevan; Gerard Desgarrega Puigdevall; Joan Munar Martinez; Martin Parejo Maza	Spain	45.89	

== See also ==
- List of IPC world records in athletics
