= Tadeusz Chudzyński =

Polish Paralympic athlete

Medal record

Men's para-athletics

Representing Poland

Paralympic Games
Bronze medal – third place	2000 Sydney	1500 metres T20

Tadeusz Chudzyński is a paralympic athlete from Poland competing mainly in category T20 1500m events.

Tadeusz competed at the 2000 Summer Paralympics in Sydney, Australia there he competed in the 1500m for intellectually disabled athletes winning the bronze medal.
