= Manuel Garnica (runner) =

Spanish Paralympic athlete

Personal information
- Nationality: Spanish
- Born: Manuel Garnica Roldán; August 25, 1978 (age 47) Granada, Spain

Sport
- Country: Spain
- Sport: Track and field (T12)
Medal record
IPC Athletics European Championships
Silver medal – second place	2016 Grosseto	5000m T11
Bronze medal – third place	2014 Swansea	1500m T11

Manuel Garnica Roldán (born August 25, 1978) is a Spanish Paralympic athlete competing mainly in category T12 long-distance track and field events. He has a vision impairment, retinitis pigmentosa, a degenerative disease. Garnica competed in the 2008 Summer Paralympics where he finished sixth in the T12 marathon and had a DNF in the 10,000 meter race. He has competed in a number of other races, most in Spain. At 2011 IPC World Athletics Championships in Christchurch, he finished fourth in the marathon.

== Personal ==
Garnica was born August 25, 1978, in Granada, Spain. His father was a police officer. While born in Granada, his family moved to Valencia when he was very young. His vision problem manifested itself by the time he was two years old, when he was diagnosed with retinitis pigmentosa, a degenerative disease. When he was nine-years-old, he learned to read using braille after his vision started to deteriorate more. Prior to that age, he played basketball and handball.

Garnica moved to Madrid to study physiotherapy and train to become a physical education teacher. In 2009, he earned an award for best athlete with a disability at the Onda Cero Sport Awards.

== Athletics ==
Garnica started in athletics after his vision severely deteriorated, and is a T12 long-distance track and field events.

In 2004, Garnica competed in a Fun Run in Cordoba that was part of the provisional racing calendar. He finished in third. In 2007, he competed in the Cross Christmas of Fatima Race. In 2008, he competed in the Ruta de la Miel Race where he finished ninth overall.

Garnica competed in the 2008 Summer Paralympics where he finished sixth in the T12 marathon and had a DNF in the 10,000 meter race.

In 2009, Garnica failed to qualify for the European Athletics Championships. That year, he came in second in the Memorial Adolfo Rivera race with a time of 30.55, one second behind winner Joaquín de la Vega de la Coba. He also competed in the Subida al Santuario Virgen de la Sierra Race where he finished second with a time of 1.3:59. He participated in the Paternal Gran Fondo Half Marathon, where he finished fifth. In 2010, he competed in the City of Villa del Rio Race, where he finished first in the 500 meter race. That year, he also competed in the 'A goal for all' 10 km race, where he came in first in the men's vision impaired group. In 2011, his guide runner was Maribel Díaz. The pair competed in the Race of Trinity, which they won with a time of 30:19. The race was the first in the Spanish Provisional Racing Circuit. He also competed in the Villafranca de Cordoba Solidarity Race in 2011. He also competed in the 2011 Cordoba Half Marathon, where he came in first in the men's vision impaired group.

Garnica competed at the 2011 IPC World Athletics Championships in Christchurch, New Zealand where he finished fourth in the T12 marathon. He was one of two Spanish runners competing in the marathon. He qualified for the 2011 IPC Championships after setting a qualifying time of 2.35:54 in the Sevilla Marathon. His guide runner for both races was Joaquin de la Vega. In 2012, he was a recipient of a Plan ADO €2,500 coaching scholarship. In July 2013, he participated in the 2013 IPC Athletics World Championships.
