= Abderrahman Ait Khamouch =

Spanish Paralympic athlete

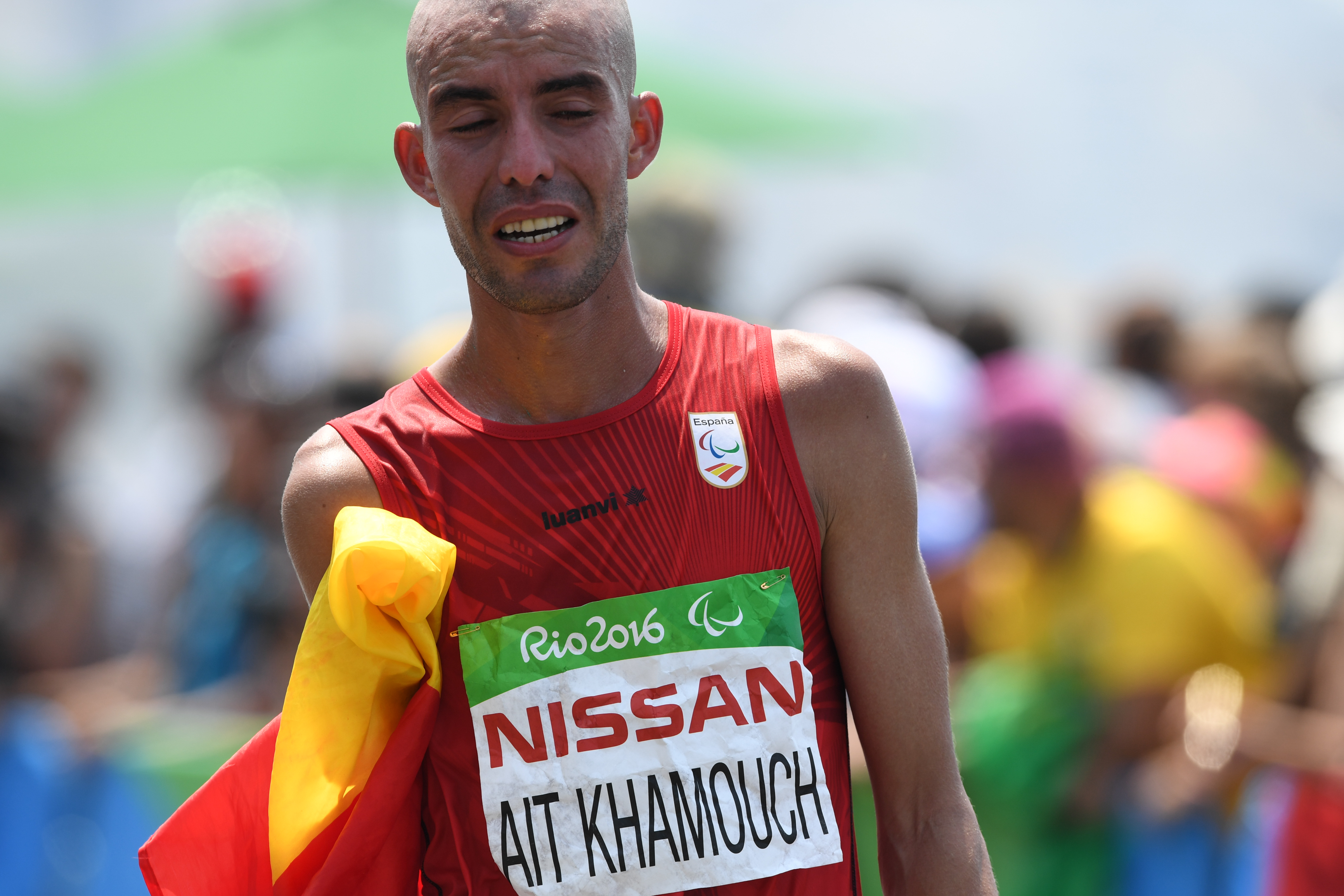
- Abderrahman Ait Khamouch in 2016

Personal information
- Full name: Abderrahman Ait Khamouch Badaui
- Nationality: Spanish
- Born: 9 November 1986 (age 39)

Sport
- Country: Spain
- Sport: Track and field (T46)
Medal record
Men's para athletics (T46)
Representing Spain
Paralympic Games
Silver medal – second place	2008 Beijing	1500m – T46
Silver medal – second place	2012 London	Marathon – T46
Silver medal – second place	2016 Rio de Janeiro	Marathon – T46
Bronze medal – third place	2008 Beijing	800m – T46
IPC Athletics European Championships
Gold medal – first place	2012 Stadskanaal	1500m – T46
Silver medal – second place	2012 Stadskanaal	800m – T46

Abderrahman Ait Khamouch Badaui (born 9 November 1986) is a Paralympic athlete from Spain competing mainly in category T46 middle distance and marathon events. Originally from Morocco, he emigrated to Spain and gained citizenship in August 2008. He has represented Spain at the 2008 and 2012 Summer Paralympics, winning silver in the 1,500 meters and bronze in the 800 meters in 2008, and silver in the marathon in 2012.

== Personal ==
Ait Khamouch was born on 9 November 1986. He was born in Morocco. He is the second youngest child in his family. He has an arm amputation, as a result of a fall when he was a child that led to medical complications that later resulted in him getting gangrene. The doctors were left with little choice but to amputate his right arm almost at his shoulder.

As a minor, when Ait Khamouch was 15 years old, he tried to enter Spain illegally three times via boats from Laayoune to the Canary Islands. During these trips, he saw people die. He eventually got a boat to Fuerteventura and successfully entered Spain in 2001. From there, he traveled to Madrid and then on to Barcelona with friends via the train.

When Ait Khamouch first got work in Barcelona, he worked as an attendant at a parking lot because he spoke French. He got Spanish citizenship on 25 August 2008.

Ait Khamouch wrote an autobiography in Arabic titled "The Angel with the Crooked Wing." It was translated into Spanish. He speaks Spanish, French and Arabic.

In 2013, he was awarded the silver Real Orden al Mérito Deportivo.

== Athletics ==
Ait Khamouch is a Paralympic athlete competing mainly in category T46 middle distance and marathon events. His first athletics race was one organized by French tourists in his hometown in Morocco. He won the race, and the prize of a small blue truck. Following the race, he approached the Morocco Paralympic Committee about competing in athletics, but they rejected him citing a variety of factors. Following his arrival in Spain, he eventually took part in a race in Barcelona organized by El Corte Inglés in 2003 where his performance attracted attention and eventually coaching. He then competed in other races in the area. The Athletics Federation of Catalonia and others assisted in getting Ait Khamouch Spanish citizenship in time for him to represent Spain at the 2008 Summer Paralympics.

The first athletics club Ait Khamouch belonged to in Spain was the Athletic Club Nou Barris. In 2004, he participated the Spanish Paralympic national championships where he won a gold medal in the 800 meters. In 2005, he received a scholarship from the Spanish Paralympic Committee. In 2008, he trained at the Center for High Performance San Cugat (Barcelona). He qualified for and competed in the 2011 IPC Athletics World Championships where he was one of thirty-two competitors representing Spain. In 2012, he was a recipient of a Plan ADO €2,500 coaching scholarship. He lost part of his Catalan-based scholarship a year and a half prior to this, a decision that Ait Khamouch labeled as politically motivated. In 2012, he set a world record in his classification at the Barcelona Marathon. In doing so, he also set a qualifying time in the event for the London Paralympics. That year, he also competed in the Barcelona half marathon where he set a personal best time. In July 2013, he participated in the 2013 IPC Athletics World Championships. In November 2013, he competed in the Jean Bouin-Gran Premio Allianz race in Barcelona.

=== Paralympics ===
Ait Khamouch competed in the 2008 Summer Paralympics in Beijing, China. There he won a silver medal in the men's 1500 metres — T46 event and a bronze medal in the men's 800 metres — T46 event. Four years later, he competed in the 2012 Summer Paralympics in London, Great Britain. There he won a silver medal in the men's marathon — T46 event. His medal at the 2008 Games was the first one Paralympic or Olympic medal won by someone from Ait Khamouch's hometown in Morocco. His parents were able to watch him win his medal on television in Morocco.

Ait Khamouch finished in second position at the London Paralympics in the T46 marathon event because he had a coughing fit with 400 meters left in the race. He was running with a cold.
