= Miroslava Sedláčková =

Czech Paralympic athlete and para cross-country skier

Personal information
- Nickname: Mirka
- Born: 19 May 1977 (age 49) Dolní Jirčany, Czech Republic
- Height: 1.62 m (5 ft 4 in)
- Weight: 53 kg (117 lb)

Sport
- Country: Czech Republic
- Sport: Paralympic athletics Para cross-country skiing
- Disability class: T11
Medal record
Paralympic athletics
Representing Czech Republic
World Championships
Gold medal – first place	2011 Christchurch	800m T11
Bronze medal – third place	2013 Lyon	400m T11
Bronze medal – third place	2013 Lyon	800m T11
European Championships
Silver medal – second place	2012 Stadskanaal	200m T11
Silver medal – second place	2012 Stadskanaal	400m T12
Bronze medal – third place	2012 Stadskanaal	100m T11

Miroslava Sedláčková (born 19 May 1977) is a retired Czech Paralympic athlete and para cross-country skier. She has competed in four Paralympic Games: she took part in the 1998 and 2002 Winter Paralympics in the cross-country skiing at the Paralympics and 2008 and 2012 Summer Paralympics in athletics at the Paralympics.

In 2015, Sedláčková fell and broke her arm which developed into osteosarcoma then she retired from sport. After retirement, she has become a lawyer in Prague.
