= Roger Puigbò =

Spanish Paralympic athlete

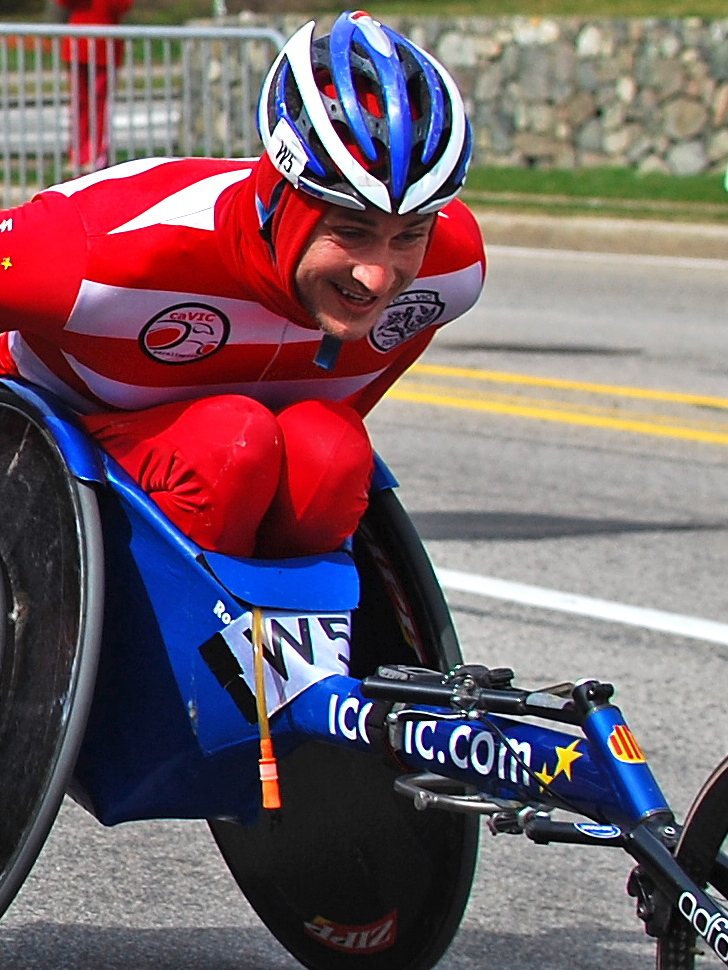
- Puigbò at 2009 Boston Marathon

Personal information
- Full name: Roger Puigbò i Verdaguer
- Nationality: Spanish
- Born: 20 March 1978 (age 48) Vic, Barcelona, Spain

Sport
- Country: Spain
- Sport: Track and field (T53 )
Medal record
IPC European Championships
| Gold medal – first place | 2012 Stadskanaal | 400m – T53 |
| Gold medal – first place | 2012 Stadskanaal | 800m – T53 |
| Silver medal – second place | 2012 Stadskanaal | 5000m – T54 |
| Silver medal – second place | 2014 Swansea | 800m – T53 |

Roger Puigbò i Verdaguer (born 20 March 1978) is a Spanish track and field athlete. He has a disability and uses a wheelchair. He is a long-distance athlete, competing in wheelchair marathons around the world. Puigbo competed at the 2004 Summer Paralympics, 2008 Summer Paralympics, and 2012 Summer Paralympics.

== Personal ==
Puigbo was born 20 March 1978, in Vic, Barcelona, has a disability, and uses a wheelchair.

== Athletics ==
Puigbo is a T53 wheelchair track and field athlete.

Puigbo competed at the 1998 IPC World Championship in Birmingham, England in the marathon and the 400 meter races. He finished third at the Berlin Marathon in 2000. He competed in the 2001 Mediterranean Games in Tunisia where he finished fifth in the 1,500 meters. He competed at the Nottwil, Switzerland hosted 2001 I European Wheelchair Athletics 2001 where he finished fourth in the 400 meter event and the 800 meter event. He also finished eighth in the 5,000 meter event and ninth in the 1,500 meter event.

At the 2003 EPC I Qtr. Europe in Assen, Netherlands, Puigbo finished second in the 800 meters and third in the 400 meters. He finished fourth at the Ōita Marathon in 2005. He competed at the 2005 Mediterranean Games in Almería, Spain, and finished second in the 1,500 meter event. He competed at the 2005 EPC European Athletics Championship in Espoo, Finland, and finished first in the 400 meters, second in the 800 meter event, second in the 4 × 100 meter relay, and second in the marathon.

Competing as a 28-year-old and wearing bib number W4, Puigbo finished 5th at the 2006 Boston Marathon. He remained with the group that finished in second, third, and fourth throughout much of the race. He finished third at the Berlin Marathon in 2006. He finished fourth at the Paris Marathon in 2006. He finished sixth in the Schenkon Marathon in Switzerland in 2006. He competed at the IWAS Open European Championship in Stadskanaal, Netherlands, and finished first in the 800 meter event, first in the 5,000 meter event, and third in the 1,500 meter event. Competing at the 2006 World Indoor Championships in Bollnäs, Sweden, he finished second in the 3000 meter event. He competed at the 2006 World Athletics Championships in Assen, The Netherlands, and finished sixth in the 800 meters and sixth in the Marathon.

Puigbo finished fifth at the Paris Marathon in 2007. He finished seventh at the 2007 New York City Marathon. He finished third at the "Oz Day" 10 km in Sydney, Australia in 2007. He finished third at the Ōita Marathon in 2007.

At the Paris Marathon in 2008, Puigbo finished fourth. He won the Schenkon Marathon in Switzerland in 2008. He finished fifth at the "ING Georgia Half Marathon" in Atlanta in 2008.

At the Oensingen Marathon in 2009, Puigbo came in first place, only 0.2 seconds faster than the second-place finisher. He won the 2009 Seville Marathon. He finished third at the Paris Marathon in 2009. He finished sixth at the Paris Marathon in 2010.

Puigbo finished seventh at the Ōita Marathon in 2010. At the 2011 London Marathon, he finished fourth while spending most of the race with the lead pack.

First place was won by Puigbo at the 2012 Seville Marathon. In 2012, he was a recipient of a Plan ADO €20,000 athlete scholarship with a €3,000 reserve and a coaching scholarship of €2,500. In the lead-up to the London Paralympics, in July 2012, he competed in a Diamond League race at the Crystal Palace National Sports Centre in London. In May 2012, he competed at the Paralympic World Cup in Manchester, earning a fourth-place finish in one of his races. He won a gold medal at the 2012 European Championships.

At the 2013 Paris Marathon, Puigbo finished third.

=== Paralympics ===
Puigbo competed at the 2004 Summer Paralympics, 2008 Summer Paralympics, and 2012 Summer Paralympics. His best finish in Athens was 5th in the 800 meters, the best finish in Beijing was the 5th in the 800 meters, and his best finish in London was 6th in the 5,000 meter qualifying round. At the 2008 Summer Paralympics, he finished 5th in the 800 meters. He had a Did Not Finish in the marathon at the London Paralympics.
