= Alexey Bychenok =

Russian Para athlete, cross-country skier, and biathlete (born 1986)

Personal information
- Nationality: Russian
- Born: 31 July 1986 (age 40) Temirtau, Russia

Sport
- Country: Russia
- Sport: Para athletics, Para Nordic skiing (Para cross-country skiing and Para biathlon)
- Disability class: LW12
- Coached by: Irina Gromova
Medal record
Representing Russia
Men's Para biathlon
Winter Paralympics
Silver medal – second place	2014 Sochi	12.5km middle sitting
Men's Para athletics
IPC Athletics World Championships
Bronze medal – third place	2015 Doha	200m T54
IPC Athletics European Championships
Gold medal – first place	2012 Stadskanaal	800m T54
Bronze medal – third place	2012 Stadskanaal	400m T54

Alexey Bychenok (born 31 July 1986) is a Russian male Para cross-country skier and biathlete who also competed in Para athletics. He represented Russia at the 2014 Winter Paralympics and competed in the biathlon events. Alexey claimed his first Paralympic medal for Russia after claiming a silver medal in the men's middle sitting event during the 2014 Winter Paralympics.

== Biography ==
Bychenok was born in Temirtau, Russia (now situated in Kazakhstan). He had an injury that he sustained in 1995 caused his legs to be amputated. He took the sport of cross-country skiing in 2010.

== Career ==
Bychenok competed in the 2014 Winter Paralympics, which was his first Paralympic event and took part only in the biathlon events despite being a more specialised cross-country skier. He maximised the opportunity to represent his country in the 2014 Winter Paralympics which was held in his home soil and managed to clinch a silver medal in the 12.5 km middle sitting category.

He decided to compete in the Paralympic athletics as well in addition to Para Nordic skiing and competed in few international Athletics Championships including the 2015 London Marathon, 2015 IPC Athletics World Championships. He claimed a bronze medal in the men's 200m T54 event as a part of the 2015 IPC Athletics World Championships.

Bychenok was originally named in Russian squad for the 2016 Summer Paralympics but the team was disqualified to compete in the Olympics and Paralympics mainly due to the Doping scandal. He was not selected to compete for Neutral Paralympic Athletes at the 2018 Winter Paralympics at the 2018 Winter Paralympics as Russia was banned from competing from both 2018 Winter Olympics and in the 2018 Winter Paralympics, though he was considered for selection earlier by the Russian Paralympic Committee.
