= Gunilla Wallengren =

Swedish Paralympic athlete

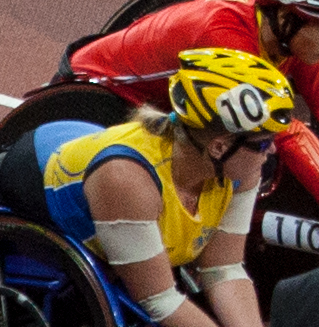
- Wallengren at 2012 Summer Paralympics

Personal information
- Born: 2 May 1979 (age 47) Halanda, Sweden
- Home town: Vanersborg, Sweden

Sport
- Country: Sweden
- Sport: Paralympic athletics
- Disability: Spina bifida
- Disability class: T54
- Events: 400 metres 800 metres 1500 metres 5000 metres
- Club: Bohus Friidrott
- Coached by: Ingela Nilsson
Medal record
Paralympic athletics
Representing Sweden
World Championships
Silver medal – second place	2015 Doha	Women's 1500m T54
European Championships
Gold medal – first place	2012 Stadskanaal	Women's 1500m T54
Silver medal – second place	2012 Stadskanaal	Women's 400m T54
Silver medal – second place	2014 Swansea	Women's 1500m T54
Silver medal – second place	2014 Swansea	Women's 5000m T54
Silver medal – second place	2016 Grosseto	Women's 400m T54
Silver medal – second place	2016 Grosseto	Women's 800m T54
Silver medal – second place	2016 Grosseto	Women's 5000m T54
Bronze medal – third place	2012 Stadskanaal	Women's 800m T54
Bronze medal – third place	2014 Swansea	Women's 400m T54
Bronze medal – third place	2016 Grosseto	Women's 1500m T54
Bronze medal – third place	2018 Berlin	Women's 5000m T54

Gunilla Wallengren (born 2 May 1979) is a Swedish Paralympic athlete who competes in middle-distance events in international level events.

At the age of six, she joined Drivringen, a newly started club in her home town of Trollhättan.

She has won the Great North Run four times.

At the 5000m race held at the 2008 Beijing Paralympics, Wallengren was involved in a mass crash involving six participants, losing consciousness for several minutes. She recovered and set her sights on the 2012 Paralympics in London. Her results there was a 8th place at 400m and 9th place at 1500m.
