= Alexandra Helbling =

Swiss Paralympic athlete (born 1993)

Personal information
- Born: 25 October 1993 (age 32) Sri Lanka
- Home town: Nottwil, Switzerland
- Height: 1.64 m (5 ft 5 in)

Sport
- Country: Switzerland
- Sport: Paralympic athletics
- Disability: Incomplete paraplegia
- Disability class: T54
- Event(s): 100 metres 200 metres 400 metres 800 metres 1500 metres
- Club: RC Zentralschweiz, Malters, Switzerland
- Coached by: Paul Odermatt, André Imhof
Medal record
Paralympic athletics
Representing Switzerland
European Championships
Gold medal – first place	2018 Berlin	Women's 400m T54
Silver medal – second place	2018 Berlin	Women's 200m T54
Silver medal – second place	2018 Berlin	Women's 800m T53/54
Silver medal – second place	2018 Berlin	Women's 1500m T54
Bronze medal – third place	2014 Swansea	Women's 800m T54
Bronze medal – third place	2016 Grosseto	Women's 200m T54
Bronze medal – third place	2016 Grosseto	Women's 100m T54
Bronze medal – third place	2016 Grosseto	Women's 400m T54
Bronze medal – third place	2018 Berlin	Women's 100m T54

Alexandra Helbling (born 25 October 1993 in Sri Lanka) is a Swiss Paralympic athlete who competes in sprinting and middle distance running events in international level events.
