= José Monteiro (athlete) =

Portuguese Paralympic athlete

Medal record

Paralympic athletics

Representing Portugal

Paralympic Games
Silver medal – second place	2000 Sydney	800m - T46

José Monteiro (Algarve) is a Paralympian athlete from Portugal competing mainly in category T46 middle-distance events.

José Monteiro competed in the 2000 Summer Paralympics in Sydney, Australia. There he won a silver medal in the men's 800 metres - T46 event. He also competed at the 2004 Summer Paralympics in Athens, Greece, finishing eighth in the men's 800 metres - T46 event and went out in the first round of the men's 1500 metres - T46 event. He also competed at the 2008 Summer Paralympics in Beijing, China where he went out in the first round of the men's 800 metres - T46 event
