= Tomasz Hamerlak =

Polish Paralympic athlete

Medal record

Paralympic athletics

Representing Poland

Paralympic Games
Bronze medal – third place	2004 Athens	Marathon - T54

IPC European Championships
Gold medal – first place	2012 Stadskanaal	1500 metres - T54
Gold medal – first place	2012 Stadskanaal	5000 metres - T54
Bronze medal – third place	2014 Swansea	5000 metres – T54

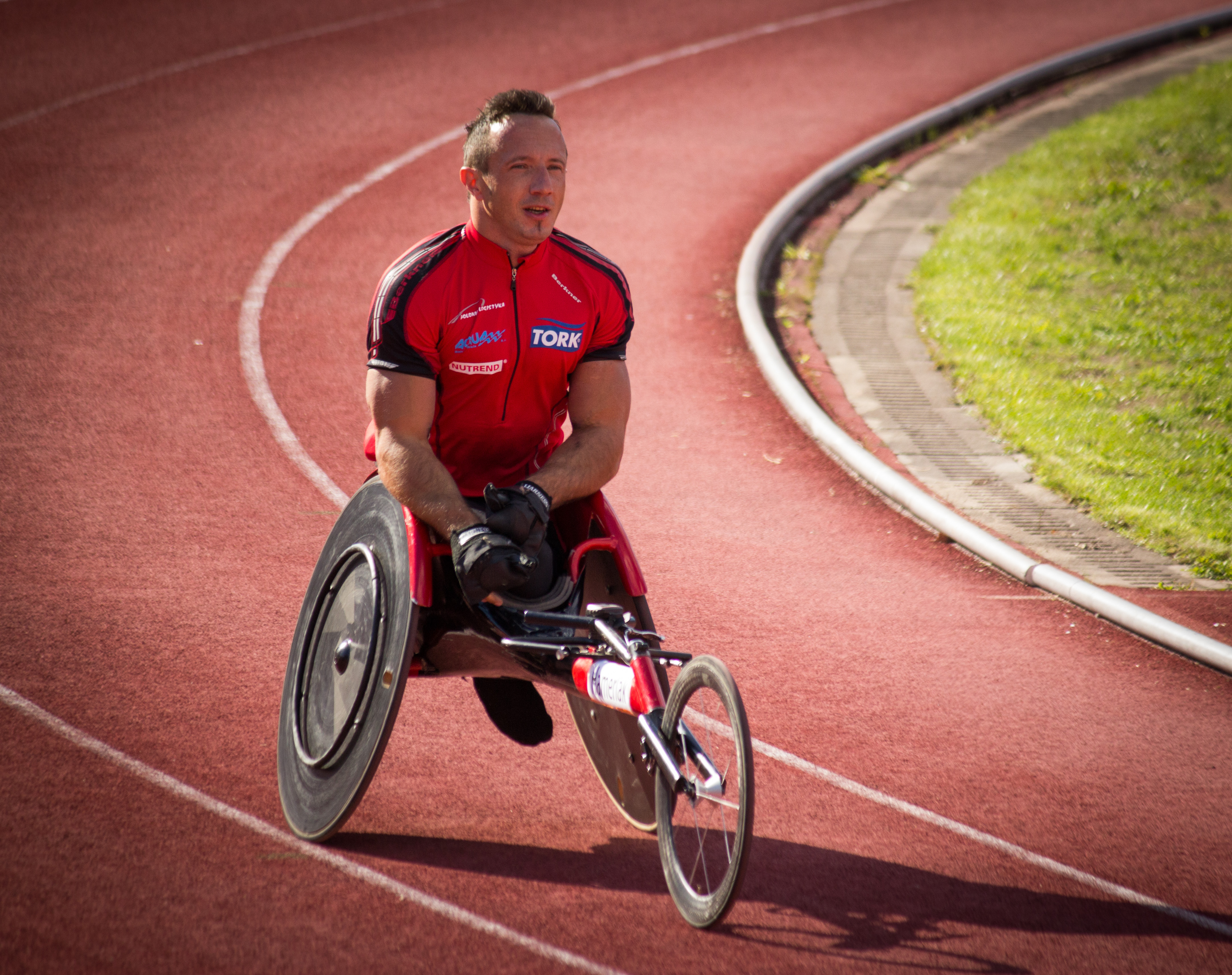
Tomasz Hamerlak in 2013

Tomasz Hamerlak is a Paralympic athlete from Poland competing mainly in category T54 distance events.

Tomasz has competed in three Paralympics, always competing in a variety of middle and long-distance events. His only Paralympic medal success came in 2004 with a bronze medal in the T54 marathon.
