= Łukasz Wietecki =

Polish Paralympic athlete (born 1984)

Personal information
- Nickname: Luka
- Born: 29 July 1984 (age 41) Olkusz, Polandddddd
- Height: 1.77 m (5 ft 10 in)

Sport
- Country: Poland
- Sport: Para athletics (2000–2018); Para triathlon (2014–present)
- Disability: Optic nerve atrophy
- Disability class: PTVI3
Medal record
Representing Poland
Men's para-athletics
World Championships
Gold medal – first place	2011 Christchurch	800m T13
Silver medal – second place	2011 Christchurch	1500m T13
Silver medal – second place	2013 Lyon	800m T13
European Championships
Gold medal – first place	2016 Grosseto	1500m T13
Gold medal – first place	2016 Grosseto	5000m T13
Bronze medal – third place	2014 Swansea	1500m T13
Men's paratriathlon
World Championships
Bronze medal – third place	2015 Chicago	PT5
European Championships
Silver medal – second place	2018 Tartu	PTVI
Bronze medal – third place	2015 Geneva	PT5
Bronze medal – third place	2017 Kitzbühel	PTVI
Men's para-duathlon
World Championships
Gold medal – first place	2016 Aviles	PT5

Łukasz Wietecki (born 29 July 1984) is a Polish paratriathlete and former middle distance runner who competes in international level events. He has participated at the Paralympic Games in 2012 and 2016 in athletics but did not medal in any of his finals.

Wietecki switched to paratriathlon in 2014 and is a World bronze medalist and a three time European medalist. He trains in Poznań and is aiming to compete at the 2020 Summer Paralympics.
