= 2012 IPC Athletics European Championships =

IPC Athletics European Championships
- Host city: Stadskanaal, Netherlands
- Nations: 38
- Athletes: 550
- Events: Track and field
- Dates: 23 – 28 June
- Main venue: Stadskanaal Stadium

The 2012 IPC Athletics European Championships was a track and field competition for athletes with a disability open to International Paralympic Committee (IPC) affiliated countries within Europe. It was held in Stadskanaal, Netherlands and lasted from 23 to 28 June. The event was held in the Stadskanaal Stadium and was the last major European disability athletics event before the forthcoming 2012 Summer Paralympics in London. Approximately 550 athletes from 38 countries attended the games. Several countries used the Championships to finalise the remaining places for the Paralympics.

== Venue ==

The event was held at the Stadskanaal Stadium.

== Format ==
The 2012 IPC Athletics European Championships was an invitational tournament taking in track and field events. No combined sports were included in the 2012 Championships. Not all events were open to all classifications, with several throwing and jumping events being contested between classifications, which were then decided on a points system. The men's 100m relay was the only event to use mixed classifications as a team, with each leg of the relay contested by a different classification athlete. There were no women's relay events. In total there were 144 events held over 17 disciplines.

Athletes finishing in first place are awarded the gold medal, second place the silver medal and third place the bronze. If only three competitors are available to challenge for an event then no bronze medal is awarded. Some events were classed as 'no medal' events.

== Events ==
=== Classification ===
To ensure competition is as fair and balanced as possible, athletes are classified dependent on how their disability impacts on their chosen event/s. Thus athletes may compete in an event against competitors with a different disability to themselves. Where there are more than one classification in one event, (for example discus throw F54/55/56), a points system is used to determine the winner.

- F = field athletes
- T = track athletes
- 11-13 – visually impaired, 11 and 12 compete with a sighted guide
- 20 – intellectual disability
- 31-38 – cerebral palsy or other conditions that affect muscle co-ordination and control. Athletes in class 31-34 compete in a seated position; athletes in class 35-38 compete standing.
- 41-46 – amputation, les autres
- 51-58 – wheelchair athletes

=== Schedule ===
●	Opening ceremony	Events	●	Closing ceremony

Date →		23	24	25	26	27	28
100 m	Men; Details		T11; T12; T35; T36; T42	T34; T37; T54; T13; T46	T51/53; T44; T38		
100 m	Women; Details		T11; T12	T34/52/53	T42; T44; T46	T13; T35; T36; T37; T38; T54	
200 m	Men; Details			T44		T46; T53; T36; T37; T38; T42; T11; T34; T35	T12; T13
200 m	Women; Details		T34	T53; T53; T35; T36; T44; T46	T37; T34/52/53; T11; T12		
400 m	Men; Details			T38	T46; T54	T12; T44	T36; T53
400 m	Women; Details		T46; T13	T37; T53; T54	T12	T44	
800 m	Men; Details			T53; T46	T12; T36	T54	T13
800 m	Women; Details				T12; T53; T54		
1500 m	Men; Details				T54; T11; T20; T37	T13; T46	T54
1500 m	Women; Details						T12; T20; T54
5000 m	Men; Details						T11; T12
4×100 m relay	Men; Details						T11-T13
4×100 m relay	Women; Details						T35-T38
Long jump	Men; Details		T37/38	F36	F11	F20; F13	F42/44
Long jump	Women; Details		F13	F20; F11; F12	F37; F38	F42/44/46	
Triple jump	Men; Details		F46				F11; F12
Shot put	Men; Details		F20; F54	F55; F37; F38; F11	F32/33/34; F52/53	F56/57/58	F40; F46; F42; F44
Shot put	Women; Details		F37	F35/36; F57/58	F20	F40/42/44; F11/12	F34
Discus throw	Men; Details		F51/53/53; F11; F37/38; F57/58		F40/44; F42	F54; F55; F35/36; F55	F32/33/34
Discus throw	Women; Details			F51/52/53	F35/36	F37; F57/58	F32/33; F11/12
Javelin throw	Men; Details		F12/13; F44	F33/34/52/53	F54; F55/56	F40; F42	F57/58
Javelin throw	Women; Details		F57/58	F12/13 + F37/38		F52/53/33/34	F46; F54/55/56
Club throw	Men; Details			F32; F51			
Club throw	Women; Details		F31/32/51				
Ceremonies		●					●

== Medal table ==
The medal table at the end of Day 5 (28 June).

* Host nation (Netherlands)

Rank	Nation	Gold	Silver	Bronze	Total
1	Russia (RUS)	29	28	19	76
2	Ukraine (UKR)	17	14	10	41
3	Germany (GER)	11	14	4	29
4	Poland (POL)	11	6	12	29
5	Spain (ESP)	8	9	5	22
6	Greece (GRE)	8	8	5	21
7	Netherlands (NED)*	8	8	4	20
8	Great Britain (GBR)	7	7	12	26
9	Bulgaria (BUL)	5	5	3	13
10	Serbia (SRB)	5	1	2	8
11	Belarus (BLR)	4	4	3	11
12	Italy (ITA)	4	0	6	10
13	Finland (FIN)	3	2	4	9
14	Sweden (SWE)	3	2	3	8
15	Azerbaijan (AZE)	3	0	0	3
16	Switzerland (SUI)	2	4	4	10
17	Denmark (DEN)	2	4	1	7
18	Czech Republic (CZE)	2	3	8	13
19	Portugal (POR)	2	3	4	9
20	Lithuania (LTU)	2	1	1	4
21	Cyprus (CYP)	2	1	0	3
22	Croatia (CRO)	1	4	5	10
23	Slovakia (SVK)	1	3	2	6
24	Turkey (TUR)	1	2	4	7
25	Ireland (IRL)	1	2	0	3
26	Norway (NOR)	1	0	0	1
26	Romania (ROU)	1	0	0	1
28	Austria (AUT)	0	4	0	4
29	Iceland (ISL)	0	1	2	3
29	Slovenia (SLO)	0	1	2	3
31	France (FRA)	0	1	0	1
32	Hungary (HUN)	0	0	2	2
33	Belgium (BEL)	0	0	1	1
33	Bosnia and Herzegovina (BIH)	0	0	1	1
Totals (34 entries)		144	142	129	415

Source: paralympic.org

== Highlights ==
=== Broken records ===
World Records

Event	Round	Name	Nation	Time/Distance	Date
Men's 200m T42	Final	Richard Whitehead	United Kingdom	24.93	27 June
Men's 800m T36	Final	Evgenii Shvetcov	Russia	2:05.05	26 June
Men's Shot Put F40	Final	Paschalis Stathelakos	Greece	13.01m	28 June
Men's Shot Put F46	Final	Dmytro Ibragimov	Ukraine	15.46m	28 June
Men's Discus Throw F32	Final	Frantisek Serbus	Czech Republic	20.41m	28 June
Women's 100m T42	Final	Martina Caironi	Italy	15.89	26 June
Women's 1500m T11	Final	Annalisa Minetti	Italy	4:51.75	28 June
Women's 4x100m Relay T35-38	Final	Russian women's relay team	Russia	54.77	28 June
Women's Long Jump F38	Final	Inna Stryzhak	Ukraine	4.96m	26 June
Women's Shot Put F34	Final	Birgit Kober	Germany	10.06m	28 June
Women's Shot Put F35	Final	Mariia Pomazan	Ukraine	11.34	25 June
Women's Discus Throw F35	Final	Mariia Pomazan	Ukraine	28.88	26 June

=== Multiple medalists ===
Athletes who have obtained at least three medals.

Name	Nationality	Medals	Events
Margarita Goncharova	Russia	Gold; Gold; Gold; Silver	Women's 100m T38; Women's 200m T38; Women's 4x100m relay T35-38; Women's long jump T38
Evgenii Shvetcov	Russia	Gold; Gold; Gold	Men's 100m T36; Men's 400m T36; Men's 800m T36
Luis Goncalves	Portugal	Gold; Gold; Silver	Men's 200m T12; Men's 400m T12; Men's 4x100m relay T11-13
Roman Kapranov	Russia	Gold; Gold; Silver	Men's 100m T37; Men's 400m T37; Men's 200m T37
Roger Puigbo Verdaguer	Spain	Gold; Gold; Silver	Men's 400m T53; Men's 800m T53; Men's 5000m T54
Maria Seifert	Germany	Gold; Gold; Silver	Women's 100m T37; Women's 200m T37; Women's 4x100m relay T35-38
Roman Pavlyk	Ukraine	Gold; Silver; Silver	Men's 200m T36; Men's 100m T36; Men's long jump T36
Drazenko Mitrovic	Serbia	Gold; Gold; Bronze	Men's discus throw F54; Men's shot put F54; Men's javelin throw F54
Radoslav Zlatanov	Bulgaria	Silver; Silver; Bronze	Men's 200m T13; Men's long jump T13; Men's 100m T13

== Participating nations ==
Below is the list of countries who agreed to participate in the Championships and the requested number of athlete places for each.

- Austria
- Azerbaijan
- Belarus
- Belgium
- Bulgaria
- Bosnia and Herzegovina
- Croatia
- Cyprus
- Czech Republic
- Denmark
- Spain
- Estonia
- Finland
- France
- Great Britain
- Germany
- Greece
- Hungary
- Ireland
- Iceland
- Italy
- Latvia
- Lithuania
- Montenegro
- Netherlands
- Norway
- Poland
- Portugal
- Romania
- Russia
- Slovenia
- San Marino
- Serbia
- Switzerland
- Slovakia
- Sweden
- Turkey
- Ukraine

== See also ==
- 2012 European Athletics Championships

== Footnotes ==
Notes
