= Athletics at the 2020 Summer Paralympics – Women's 400 metres =

Athletics – Women's 400 metres at the XVI Paralympic Games
- Venue: Tokyo National Stadium
- Dates: 27 August – 4 September 2021
- No. of events: 9
- Competitors: 110 from 46 nations

The Women's 400m athletics events for the 2020 Summer Paralympics took place at the Tokyo National Stadium from August 27 to September 4, 2021. A total of 9 events were contested over this distance.

== Schedule ==
R	Round 1	½	Semifinals	F	Final

Date	Fri 27		Sat 28		Sun 29		Mon 30		Tue 31		Wed 1		Thu 2		Fri 3		Sat 4	
Event	M	E	M	E	M	E	M	E	M	E	M	E	M	E	M	E	M	E
T11 400m		R	F															
T12 400m								R	F									
T13 400m														R			F	
T20 400m								R		F								
T37 400m								R		F								
T38 400m																R		F
T47 400m		R		F														
T53 400m													R	F				
T54 400m													R	F				

== Medal summary ==
The following is a summary of the medals awarded across all 400 metres events.

Classification	Gold		Silver		Bronze	
T11	China; Liu Cuiqing; Guide: Xu Donglin	56.25 GR	Brazil; Thalita Simplício; Guide: Felipe Veloso	56.80	Colombia; Angie Lizeth Pabon Mamian; Guide: Luis Arizala	57.46
T12	Cuba; Omara Durand; Guide: Yuniol Kindelan	52.58	Ukraine; Oxana Boturchuk; Guide: Mykyta Barabanov	55.33	Venezuela; Alejandra Paola Pérez López; Guide: Markinzon Manzanilla	57.06
T13	Lamiya Valiyeva; Azerbaijan	55.00 GR	Adiaratou Iglesias Forneiro; Spain	55.53	Kym Crosby; United States	56.79
T20	Breanna Clark; United States	55.18 WR	Yuliia Shuliar; Ukraine	56.18 AR	Jardênia Félix; Brazil	57.43
T37	Jiang Fenfen; China	1:01.36 AR	Nataliia Kobzar; Ukraine	1:01.47	Sheryl James; South Africa	1:03.82
T38	Lindy Ave; Germany	1:00.00 WR	Margarita Goncharova; RPC	1:00.14	Darian Faisury Jiménez; Colombia	1:00.17 AR
T47	Anrune Weyers; South Africa	56.05	Lisbeli Vera Andrade; Venezuela	57.32	Anastasiia Soloveva; RPC	57.59
T53	Catherine Debrunner; Switzerland	56.18	Samantha Kinghorn; Great Britain	57.25	Zhou Hongzhuan; China	57.29
T54	Manuela Schär; Switzerland	53.59	Cheri Madsen; United States	53.91	Zhou Zhaoqian; China	54.10

== Results ==
The following were the results of the finals only of each of the Women's 400 metres events in each of the classifications. Further details of each event, including where appropriate heats and semi finals results, are available on that event's dedicated page.

=== T11 ===
The T11 category is for athletes with a visual impairment. A T11 athlete may be entirely without sight, or be able to perceive light, but have no ability to see the shape of a hand at any distance. T11 athletes commonly run with guides.

The final in this classification took place on 28 August 2021, at 11:45:

Rank	Lane	Name	Nationality	Time	Notes
1st place, gold medalist(s)	3	Liu Cuiqing	China	56.25	PR
2nd place, silver medalist(s)	5	Thalita Simplício	Brazil	56.80	PB
3rd place, bronze medalist(s)	7	Angie Lizeth Pabon Mamian	Colombia	57.46	PB
4	1	Linda Patricia Perez Lopez	Venezuela	57.71	PB

=== T12 ===
The T12 category is for athletes with visual impairment. Athletes in this category will generally have some residual sight, the ability to recognise the shape of a hand at a distance of 2 metres and the ability to perceive clearly will be no more than 2/60. T12 athletes commonly run with guides.

The final in this classification took place on 31 August 2021, at 11:36:

Rank	Lane	Name	Nationality	Time	Notes
1st place, gold medalist(s)	5	Omara Durand	Cuba	52.58	SB
2nd place, silver medalist(s)	3	Oxana Boturchuk	Ukraine	55.33	SB
3rd place, bronze medalist(s)	7	Alejandra Paola Pérez López	Venezuela	57.06	
4	1	Greilyz Greimal Villarroel Hernandez	Venezuela	57.69	PB

=== T13 ===
The T13 category is for athletes with a moderate visual impairment. Athletes in this category have a variety of visual impairments, but can typically recognize contours from a distance of 2 to 6 metres. Athletes in this category do not typically require a guide.

The final in this classification took place on 4 September 2021, at 10:08:

Rank	Lane	Name	Nationality	Time	Notes
1st place, gold medalist(s)	6	Lamiya Valiyeva	Azerbaijan	55.00	GR
2nd place, silver medalist(s)	7	Adiaratou Iglesias Forneiro	Spain	55.53	PB
3rd place, bronze medalist(s)	3	Kym Crosby	United States	56.79	PB
4	4	Nantenin Keïta	France	57.17	SB
5	8	Iuliia Ianovskaia	Azerbaijan	57.18	
6	5	Edmilsa Governo	Mozambique	57.68	
7	2	Mana Sasaki	Japan	58.05	AR
8	9	Erin Kerkhoff	United States	58.06	PB

=== T20 ===
The T20 category is for athletes with intellectual impairment. T20 athletes have an IQ score of 75 or less.

The final in this classification took place on 31 August 2021, at 20:38:

Rank	Lane	Name	Nationality	Time	Notes
1st place, gold medalist(s)	5	Breanna Clark	United States	55.18	WR
2nd place, silver medalist(s)	7	Yuliia Shuliar	Ukraine	56.18	AR
3rd place, bronze medalist(s)	6	Jardênia Félix	Brazil	57.43	PB
4	4	Carina Paim	Portugal	58.83	
5	8	Justyna Franieczek	Poland	59.14	
6	9	Norkelys del Carmen Gonzalez	Venezuela	59.74	
7	3	Aimi Toyama	Japan	59.99	SB
8	2	Siti Noor Iasah Mohamad Ariffin	Malaysia	1:01.05	

=== T37 ===
The T37 category is for ambulant athletes with cerebral palsy. These athletes have movement and coordination problems on one half of their body. They have good ability in their dominant side of their body (ie hemiplegia).

The final in this classification took place on 31 August 2021, at 21:45:

Rank	Lane	Name	Nationality	Time	Notes
1st place, gold medalist(s)	7	Jiang Fenfen	China	1:01.36	AR
2nd place, silver medalist(s)	5	Nataliia Kobzar	Ukraine	1:01.47	PB
3rd place, bronze medalist(s)	6	Sheryl James	South Africa	1:03.82	PB
4	2	Alina Terekh	Ukraine	1:05.96	PB
5	8	Liezel Gouws	South Africa	1:06.85	SB
6	4	Elena Tretiakova	RPC	1:07.18	SB
7	3	Dina Zamly Ali	Egypt	1:17.73	SB
	9	Viktoriia Slanova	RPC	DQ	

=== T38 ===
The T38 category is for ambulant athletes with cerebral palsy. T38 athletes have the mildest form of impairment caused by cerebral palsy, often in only one limb, and not affecting the ability to run, walk or jump freely, although impairing performance. T38 athletes may suffer minor co-ordination difficulties.

The final in this classification took place on 4 September 2021, at 20:38:

Rank	Lane	Name	Nationality	Time	Notes
1st place, gold medalist(s)	5	Lindy Ave	Germany	1:00.00	WR
2nd place, silver medalist(s)	9	Margarita Goncharova	RPC	1:00.14	PB
3rd place, bronze medalist(s)	7	Darian Faisury Jiménez	Colombia	1:00.17	AR
4	8	Kadeena Cox	Great Britain	1:01.16	SB
5	6	Luca Ekler	Hungary	1:01.22	
6	4	Katty Hurtado	Colombia	1:01.40	PB
7	3	Rhiannon Clarke	Australia	1:02.65	AR
8	2	Ali Smith	Great Britain	1:03.05	

=== T47 ===
The T47 category is for athletes who have a single below elbow or wrist amputation or similar disability, with normal function in both legs.

The final in this classification took place on 28 August 2021, at 21:07:

Rank	Lane	Name	Nationality	Time	Notes
1st place, gold medalist(s)	5	Anrune Weyers	South Africa	56.05	SB
2nd place, silver medalist(s)	4	Lisbeli Vera Andrade	Venezuela	57.32	PB
3rd place, bronze medalist(s)	6	Anastasiia Soloveva	RPC	57.59	
4	7	Li Lu	China	58.51	
5	8	Sae Tsuji	Japan	58.98	
6	2	Amanda Cerna	Chile	1:00.12	
7	3	Alissa Jordaan	Australia	1:01.30	
	9	Fernanda Yara da Silva	Brazil	DQ	WPA 18.5a

=== T53 ===
The T53 category is for wheelchair athletes with normal use of arms and hands, no or limited trunk function, and no leg function.

The final in this classification took place on 2 September, at 19:30:

Rank	Lane	Name	Nationality	Time	Notes
1st place, gold medalist(s)	4	Catherine Debrunner	Switzerland	56.18	
2nd place, silver medalist(s)	6	Samantha Kinghorn	Great Britain	57.25	
3rd place, bronze medalist(s)	3	Zhou Hongzhuan	China	57.29	
4	7	Angie Ballard	Australia	57.61	
5	5	Gao Fang	China	57.81	
6	8	Hamide Doğangün	Turkey	58.67	
7	2	Chelsea McClammer	United States	59.45	
8	1	Jessica Frotten	Canada	1:01.16	

=== T54 ===
The T54 category is for wheelchair athletes with no leg function, but near full arm function and reasonable to normal trunk function. Typically this may be caused by a lower spinal cord injury or spinal cord birth defect.

The final in this classification took place on 2 September, at 19:40:

Rank	Lane	Name	Nationality	Time	Notes
1st place, gold medalist(s)	4	Manuela Schär	Switzerland	53.59	
2nd place, silver medalist(s)	3	Cheri Madsen	United States	53.91	
3rd place, bronze medalist(s)	6	Zhou Zhaoqian	China	54.10	PB
4	5	Tatyana McFadden	United States	54.35	
5	8	Zou Lihong	China	54.82	SB
6	7	Marie Emmanuelle Anais Alphonse	Mauritius	56.15	
7	2	Eliza Ault-Connell	Australia	56.54	
8	1	Merle Menje	Germany	56.69	
