= Mozambique at the Paralympics =

- IPC code: MOZ
- NPC: Paralympic Committee Mozambique
- Medals: Gold 0 Silver 0 Bronze 1 Total 1

Summer appearances
- 2012; 2016; 2020; 2024

Mozambique made its Paralympic Games début at the 2012 Summer Paralympics in London, sending two visually impaired athletes to compete in track events.

One athlete, Edmilsa Governo, was sent to the 2016 Summer Paralympics where she won a bronze medal.

Mozambique has never taken part in the Winter Paralympic Games, and no Mozambican athlete has ever won a Paralympic medal.

== Full results for Mozambique at the Paralympics ==
Name	Games	Sport	Event	Score	Rank
Pita Bulande	2012 London	Athletics	Men's 200 m T11	26.68	4th in heat 4; did not advance
Pita Bulande	2012 London	Athletics	Men's 400 m T11	57.51	4th in heat 3; did not advance
Maria Muchavo	2012 London	Athletics	Women's 100 m T12	13.97	4th in heat 1; did not advance
Maria Muchavo	2012 London	Athletics	Women's 200 m T12	28.28	4th in heat 2; did not advance
Ussumane Cande	2012 London	Athletics	Women's 400 m T12	1:03.68	3rd in heat 1; did not advance
Edmilsa Governo	2016 Rio de Janeiro	Athletics	Women's 100 m T12	12.65	3rd in heat 3; did not advance
Edmilsa Governo	2016 Rio de Janeiro	Athletics	Women's 400 m T12	0:53.89	(bronze)
Hilario Chavela	2020 Tokyo	Athletics	Men's 400 m T13	53.02	7th in heat 2; did not advance
Hilario Chavela	2020 Tokyo	Athletics	Men's long jump T13	5.18	7th
Edmilsa Governo	2020 Tokyo	Athletics	Women's 100 m T13	12.71	6th in heat 2; did not advance
Edmilsa Governo	2020 Tokyo	Athletics	Women's 400 m T13	Heats: 55.50; Final: 57.68	1st in heat 2; 5th in final
Edmilsa Governo	2024 Paris	Athletics	Women's 400 m T13	DNS	

== See also ==
- Mozambique at the Olympics
