= Athletics at the 2016 Summer Paralympics – Women's 400 metres =

The Women's 400m athletics events for the 2016 Summer Paralympics take place at the Estádio Olímpico João Havelange from 8 September to 17 September 2016. A total of 12 events were contested over this distance for 15 different classifications.

== Schedule ==
R	Round 1	½	Semifinals	F	Final

Event↓/Date →	Thu 8	Fri 9	Sat 10	Sun 11	Mon 12	Tue 13	Wed 14	Thu 15	Fri 16	Sat 17
T11 400 metres								R	F	
T12 400 metres								R		F
T13 400 metres										F
T20 400 metres					R	F				
T34 400 metres							F			
T37 400 metres					R	F				
T38 400 metres							F			
T44 400 metres					F					
T47 400 metres						R	F			
T52 400 metres			F							
T53 400 metres			R	F						
T54 400 metres				F						

== Medal summary ==
Classification	Gold		Silver		Bronze	
T11	Liu Cuiqing guide: Xu Donglin; China	56.71	Sol Rojas guide: Edicson Medina; Venezuela	57.64	Terezinha Guilhermina guide: Rodrigo Chieregatto Arcanjo; Brazil	57.97
T12	Omara Durand guide: Yuniol Kindelan; Cuba	51.77	Oksana Boturchuk guide: Volodymyr Burakov; Ukraine	53.14	Edmilsa Governo guide: Filipe Chaimite; Mozambique	53.89
T13	Nantenin Keita; France	55.78	Ilse Hayes; South Africa	56.49	Leilia Adzhametova; Ukraine	56.60
T20	Breanna Clark; United States	57.79	Natalia Iezlovetska; Ukraine	58.48	Barbara Niewiedzial; Poland	58.51
T34	Hannah Cockroft; Great Britain	58.78	Alexa Halko; United States	1:00.79	Kare Adenegan; Great Britain	1:01.67
T37	Georgina Hermitage; Great Britain	1:00.53	Wen Xiaoyan; China	1:03.28	Neda Bahi; Tunisia	1:03.71
T38	Kadeena Cox; Great Britain	1:00.71	Chen Junfei; China	1:01.34	Verônica Hipólito; Brazil	1:03.14
T44	Marie-Amelie le Fur; France	59.27	Irmgard Bensusan; Germany	59.62	Grace Norman; United States	1:01.83
T47	Li Lu; China	58.09	Anrune Liebenberg; South Africa	58.88	Sae Tsuji; Japan	1:00.62
T52	Michelle Stilwell; Canada	1:05.43	Marieke Vervoort; Belgium	1:07.62	Kerri Morgan; United States	1:08.31
T53	Zhou Hongzhuan; China	54.43	Chelsea McClammer; United States	55.13	Angie Ballard; Australia	55.28
T54	Tatyana McFadden; United States	53.30	Cheri Madsen; United States	54.40	Zou Lihong; China	54.70

== Results ==
The following were the results of the finals of each of the Women's 400 metres events in each of the classifications. Further details of each event are available on that event's dedicated page.

=== T11 ===
The T11 category is for athletes with a visual impairment. A T11 athlete may be entirely without sight, or be able to perceive light, but have no ability to see the shape of a hand at any distance. T11 athletes commonly run with guides.

17:30 16 September 2016:

Rank	Lane	Bib	Name	Nationality	Reaction	Time	Notes
1st place, gold medalist(s)	3	169	Cuiqing Liu	China	0.159	56.71	
2nd place, silver medalist(s)	1	936	Sol Rojas	Venezuela	0.154	57.64	
3rd place, bronze medalist(s)	5	105	Terezinha Guilhermina	Brazil	0.218	57.97	
	7	119	Thalita Vitória Simplício da Silva	Brazil	0.261		DSQ

=== T12 ===
The T12 category is for athletes with visual impairment. Athletes in this category will generally have some residual sight, the ability to recognise the shape of a hand at a distance of 2 metres and the ability to perceive clearly will be no more than 2/60. T12 athletes commonly run with guides.

18:25 17 September 2016:

Rank	Lane	Bib	Name	Nationality	Reaction	Time	Notes
1st place, gold medalist(s)	3	242	Omara Durand	Cuba	0.178	51.77	
2nd place, silver medalist(s)	5	872	Oksana Boturchuk	Ukraine	0.271	53.14	
3rd place, bronze medalist(s)	1	586	Edmilsa Governo	Mozambique	0.173	53.89	
4	7	273	Melani Berges Gamez	Spain	0.155	57.66	

=== T13 ===
The T13 category is for athletes with a moderate visual impairment. Athletes in this category have a variety of visual impairments, but can typically recognize contours from a distance of 2 to 6 metres. Athletes in this category do not typically require a guide.

10:44 17 September 2016:

Rank	Lane	Bib	Name	Nationality	Reaction	Time	Notes
1st place, gold medalist(s)	3	306	Nantenin Keita	France	0.159	55.78	
2nd place, silver medalist(s)	5	736	Ilse Hayes	South Africa	0.371	56.49	
3rd place, bronze medalist(s)	2	871	Leilia Adzhametova	Ukraine	0.394	56.60	
4	7	895	Kym Crosby	United States	0.170	57.26	
5	8	874	Olena Gliebova	Ukraine	0.275	57.59	
6	4	519	Sanaa Benhama	Morocco	0.145	58.40	
7	6	704	Carolina Duarte	Portugal	0.202	58.52	
8	1	832	Somaya Bousaid	Tunisia	0.242	1:03.98	

=== T20 ===
The T20 category is for athletes with intellectual impairment. T20 athletes have an IQ score of 75 or less.

17:46 13 September 2016:

Rank	Lane	Bib	Name	Nationality	Reaction	Time	Notes
1st place, gold medalist(s)	3	893	Breanna Clark	United States	0.154	57.79	
2nd place, silver medalist(s)	4	875	Natalia Iezlovetska	Ukraine	0.207	58.48	
3rd place, bronze medalist(s)	8	694	Barbara Niewiedzial	Poland		58.51	
4	6	529	Siti Noor Iasah Mohamad Ariffin	Malaysia	0.215	58.55	
5	5	697	Sabina Stenka	Poland	0.196	59.27	
6	1	407	Piroska Csontos	Hungary	0.188	59.41	
7	2	409	Erika Keresztesi	Hungary	0.244	1:00.47	
8	7	406	Ilona Biacsi	Hungary	0.141	1:01.13	

=== T34 ===
The T34 category is for wheelchair athletes with cerebral palsy. Athletes in this category have minimal limitations or control problems in their arms and trunk while pushing a wheelchair.

17:40 14 September 2016:

Rank	Lane	Bib	Name	Nationality	Reaction	Time	Notes
1st place, gold medalist(s)	3	326	Hannah Cockroft	Great Britain		58.78	
2nd place, silver medalist(s)	1	897	Alexa Halko	United States		1:00.79	
3rd place, bronze medalist(s)	5	321	Kare Adenegan	Great Britain		1:01.67	
4	6	45	Rosemary Little	Australia		1:01.91	
5	7	619	Desiree Vranken	Netherlands		1:04.11	
6	8	465	Haruka Kitaura	Japan		1:13.82	
	4	70	Joyce Lefevre	Belgium			DSQ
	2	341	Melissa Nicholls	Great Britain			DSQ

=== T37 ===
The T37 category is for ambulant athletes with cerebral palsy. These athletes have movement and coordination problems on one half of their body. They have good ability in their dominant side of their body (ie hemiplegia).

10:14 13 September 2016:

Rank	Lane	Bib	Name	Nationality	Reaction	Time	Notes
1st place, gold medalist(s)	3	332	Georgina Hermitage	Great Britain		1:00.53	
2nd place, silver medalist(s)	5	177	Xiaoyan Wen	China		1:03.28	
3rd place, bronze medalist(s)	6	828	Neda Bahi	Tunisia		1:03.71	
4	7	165	Fenfen Jiang	China		1:05.66	
5	4	305	Mandy Francois-Elie	France		1:06.09	
6	1	168	Yingli Li	China		1:07.45	
7	8	735	Liezel Gouws	South Africa		1:09.08	
8	2	598	Johanna Benson	Namibia		1:12.35	

=== T38 ===
The T38 category is for ambulant athletes with cerebral palsy. T38 athletes have the mildest form of impairment caused by cerebral palsy, often in only one limb, and not affecting the ability to run, walk or jump freely, although impairing performance. T38 athletes may suffer minor co-ordination difficulties.

11:17 14 September 2016:

Rank	Lane	Bib	Name	Nationality	Reaction	Time	Notes
1st place, gold medalist(s)	7	327	Kadeena Cox	Great Britain		1:00.71	
2nd place, silver medalist(s)	5	160	Junfei Chen	China		1:01.34	
3rd place, bronze medalist(s)	3	106	Verônica Hipólito	Brazil		1:03.14	
4	8	43	Torita Isaac	Australia		1:04.47	
5	2	836	Sonia Mansour	Tunisia		1:04.91	
6	6	706	Maria Fernandes	Portugal		1:08.62	
7	4	477	Yuka Takamatsu	Japan		1:11.64	

=== T44 ===
The T44 category is for athletes who have a single below knee amputation or who can walk with moderately reduced function in one or both legs.

18:12 12 September 2016:

Rank	Lane	Bib	Name	Nationality	Reaction	Time	Notes
1st place, gold medalist(s)	6	308	Marie-Amelie le Fur	France		59.27	
2nd place, silver medalist(s)	3	359	Irmgard Bensusan	Germany		59.62	
3rd place, bronze medalist(s)	1	912	Grace Norman	United States		1:01.83	
4	2	452	Federica Maspero	Italy		1:03.83	
5	5	271	Sara Andres Barrio	Spain		1:05.64	
6	7	918	Liz Willis	United States		1:07.62	
7	4	898	Jessica Heims	United States		1:09.17	
	8	453	Giuseppina Versace	Italy			DSQ

=== T47 ===
The T47 category is for athletes who have a single below elbow or wrist amputation or similar disability, with normal function in both legs.

18:26 14 September 2016:

Rank	Lane	Bib	Name	Nationality	Reaction	Time	Notes
1st place, gold medalist(s)	6	166	Lu Li	China		58.09	
2nd place, silver medalist(s)	4	737	Anrune Liebenberg	South Africa		58.88	
3rd place, bronze medalist(s)	3	479	Sae Tsuji	Japan		1:00.62	
4	8	152	Amanda Cerna	Chile		1:01.48	
5	7	771	Amara Indumathi Karunathi Lallwala Palliya G.	Sri Lanka		1:01.74	
6	1	916	Amy Watt	United States		1:04.21	
7	2	676	Yeny Vargas	Peru		1:09.63	
	5	100	Teresinha de Jesus Correia Santos	Brazil			DSQ

=== T52 ===
The T52 category is for wheelchair athletes with damage to spinal cord in the higher parts of the back, substantially impaired or no trunk function, and minimal or no leg function. Pushing power comes from elbow extensions, and appears close to normal except for use of modified gloves to compensate for grip.

11:04 10 September 2016:

Rank	Lane	Bib	Name	Nationality	Reaction	Time	Notes
1st place, gold medalist(s)	4	146	Michelle Stilwell	Canada		1:05.43	
2nd place, silver medalist(s)	3	71	Marieke Vervoort	Belgium		1:07.62	
3rd place, bronze medalist(s)	7	909	Kerry Morgan	United States		1:08.31	
4	5	466	Yuka Kiyama	Japan		1:21.87	
5	6	758	Norsilawati Binte Sa'at	Singapore		1:49.56	

=== T53 ===
The T53 category is for wheelchair athletes with normal use of arms and hands, no or limited trunk function, and no leg function.

17:30 11 September 2016:

Rank	Lane	Bib	Name	Nationality	Reaction	Time	Notes
1st place, gold medalist(s)	3	188	Hongzhuan Zhou	China		54.43	
2nd place, silver medalist(s)	6	904	Chelsea McClammer	United States		55.13	
3rd place, bronze medalist(s)	5	30	Angela Ballard	Australia		55.28	
4	8	162	Lisha Huang	China		55.52	
5	4	913	Shirley Reilly	United States		56.10	
6	7	849	Hamide Kurt	Turkey		57.61	
7	1	777	Catherine Debrunner	Switzerland		58.29	
	2	337	Samantha Kinghorn	Great Britain			DSQ

=== T54 ===
The T54 category is for wheelchair athletes with no leg function, but near full arm function and reasonable to normal trunk function. Typically this may be caused by a lower spinal cord injury or spinal cord birth defect.

17:37 11 September 2016:

Rank	Lane	Bib	Name	Nationality	Reaction	Time	Notes
1st place, gold medalist(s)	6	906	Tatyana McFadden	United States		53.30	
2nd place, silver medalist(s)	4	903	Cheri Madsen	United States		54.50	
3rd place, bronze medalist(s)	3	190	Lihong Zou	China		54.70	
4	5	170	Wenjun Liu	China		54.72	
5	7	780	Manuela Schaer	Switzerland		55.27	
6	8	171	Jing Ma	China		55.83	
7	2	905	Hannah McFadden	United States		56.20	
8	1	615	Margriet van den Broek	Netherlands		57.37	
