= Athletics at the 2016 Summer Paralympics – Women's 100 metres T12 =

Event at the 2016 Summer Paralympics

Women's 100 metres T12 at the XV Paralympic Games
- Venue: Rio Olympic Stadium
- Dates: 8 and 9 September
- Competitors: 15
- Winning time: 11.40

Medalists
1st place, gold medalist(s)		Omara Durand	Cuba
2nd place, silver medalist(s)		Elena Chebanu	Azerbaijan
3rd place, bronze medalist(s)		Katrin Mueller-Rottgardt	Germany

The Women's 100 metres T12 event at the 2016 Summer Paralympics took place at the Estádio Olímpico João Havelange on 8 and 9 September. It features 15 athletes from 11 countries.

The T12 category is for athletes with visual impairment. Athletes in this category will generally have some residual sight, the ability to recognise the shape of a hand at a distance of 2 metres and the ability to perceive clearly will be no more than 2/60. T12 athletes commonly run with guides.

== Results ==
=== Heats ===
Qualification rule: The winner of each heat (Q) and the next four fastest (q) qualify for the semifinals.

==== Heat 1 ====
Rank	Athlete	Nationality	Time	Notes
1	Omara Durand; Guide: Yuniol Kindelan	Cuba	11.58	Q, PR
2	Lynda Hamri; Guide: Morsli Bouderbala	Algeria	13.52	q
3	Sara Fernande Roldan; Guide: n/a	Spain	13.96	
			Wind: –0.1 m/s	

==== Heat 2 ====
Rank	Athlete	Nationality	Time	Notes
1	Alice Côrrea; Guide: Diogo Cardaso da Silva	Brazil	12.31	Q
2	Greilyz Villarroel; Guide: Amilcar Zambrano	Tunisia	12.45	q
3	Joyleen Jeffrey; Guide: n/a	Papua New Guinea	15.33	
–	Oksana Boturchuk; Guide: Volodymyr Burakov	Ukraine	DQ	
			Wind: ±0.0 m/s	

==== Heat 3 ====
Rank	Athlete	Nationality	Time	Notes
1	Katrin Mueller-Rottgardt; Guide: Sebastian Fricke	Germany	12.47	Q
2	Shen Yaqin; Guide: Li Wen	China	12.64	q
3	Edmilsa Governo; Guide: Filipe Jaoa Chaimite	Mozambique	12.65	q, AR
			Wind: –0.4 m/s	

==== Heat 4 ====
Rank	Athlete	Nationality	Time	Notes
1	Elena Chebanu; Guide: Hakim Ibrahimov	Azerbaijan	12.24	Q
2	Sara Martinez; Guide: n/a	Spain	14.59	
–	Rose Welepa; Guide: Jeffrey John	France	DNS	
			Wind: +0.8 m/s	

=== Semifinals ===
Qualification rule: The winner of each semifinal (Q) and the next two fastest (q) qualify for the final.

==== Semifinal 1 ====
Rank	Lane	Name	Nationality	Reaction	Time	Notes
1	3	Omara Durand; Guide: Yuniol Kindelan	Cuba	0.146; 0.161	11.55	Q, PR
2	5	Katrin Mueller-Rottgardt; Guide: Sebastian Fricke	Germany	0.132; 0.157	12.11	q, PB
3	7	Greilyz Villarroel; Guide: Amilcar Zambrano	Tunisia	0.201; 0.165	12.60	
4	1	Lynda Hamri; Guide: n/a	Algeria	0.175	13.80	
				Wind: –0.1 m/s		

==== Semifinal 2 ====
Rank	Lane	Name	Nationality	Reaction	Time	Notes
1	3	Elena Chebanu; Guide: Hakim Ibrahimov	Azerbaijan	0.157; 0.160	11.81	Q
2	5	Alice Côrrea; Guide: Diogo Cardaso da Silva	Brazil	0.176; 0.165	12.20	q, PB
3	1	Edmilsa Governo; Guide: Filipe Jaoa Chaimite	Mozambique	0.150; 0.154	12.35	
4	7	Shen Yaqin; Guide: Li Wen	China	0.162; 0.165	12.55	SB
				Wind: +0.3 m/s		

=== Final ===
Rank	Lane	Name	Nationality	Reaction	Time	Notes
1st place, gold medalist(s)	5	Omara Durand; Guide: Yuniol Kindelan	Cuba	0.142; 0.170	11.40	WR
2nd place, silver medalist(s)	3	Elena Chebanu; Guide: Hakim Ibrahimov	Azerbaijan	0.173; 0.169	11.71	AR
3rd place, bronze medalist(s)	7	Katrin Mueller-Rottgardt; Guide: Sebastian Fricke	Germany	0.133; 0.141	11.99	PB
4	1	Alice Côrrea; Guide: Diogo Cardaso da Silva	Brazil	0.192; 0.176	12.26	
				Wind: –0.1 m/s		
