= Athletics at the 2024 Summer Paralympics – Women's 100 metres T12 =

Women's 100 metres T12 at the XVII Paralympic Games
- Venue: Stade de France
- Dates: 4 September 2024 (heats); 5 September 2024 (semi-finals & final)
- Competitors: 16 from 13 nations
- Winning time: 11.81

Medalists
1st place, gold medalist(s)		Omara Durand; Guide: Yuniol Kindelan Vargas	Cuba
2nd place, silver medalist(s)		Oksana Boturchuk; Guide: Mykyta Barbanov	Ukraine
3rd place, bronze medalist(s)		Katrin Mueller-Rottgardt; Guide: Noel-Phillippe Fiener	Germany

100 metres at the 2024 Summer Paralympics
Men · T11 · T12 · T13 · T34 · T35 · T36 · T37 · T38 · T44 · T47 · T51 · T52 · T53 · T54 · T63 · T64
Women · T11 · T12 · T13 · T34 · T35 · T36 · T37 · T38 · T47 · T53 · T54 · T63 · T64

The women's 100 metres T12 event at the 2024 Summer Paralympics in Paris, took place between 4 and 5 September 2024.

== Classification ==
The T12 classification is for visually impaired athletes with a LogMAR range from 1.50-2.60, and/or a maximum visual acuity range of 10 degrees. Athletes may choose to run with a guide.

== Records ==
Prior to the competition, the existing records were as follows:

World record	Omara Durand (CUB)	11.40	(Brazil) Rio de Janeiro	9 September 2016
Paralympic record	Omara Durand (CUB)	11.40	(Brazil) Rio de Janeiro	9 September 2016

Area	Time		Athlete	Location	Date
Africa	12.35		(Mozambique) Edmilsa Governo	(Brazil) Rio de Janeiro	9 September 2016
America	11.40	WR	(Cuba) Omara Durand	(Brazil) Rio de Janeiro	9 September 2016
Asia	11.91		(China) Zhou Guohua	(United Kingdom) London	1 September 2012
Europe	11.79		(Azerbaijan) Elena Chebanu	(Switzerland) Nottwil	26 May 2016
Oceania	15.00	Record mark			

== Results ==
=== Round 1 ===
All heats took place on 4 September 2024 with the first in each heat (Q) and the next 4 fastest (q) advancing to the semi-finals

==== Heat 1 ====
Rank	Lane	Athlete	Nation	Time	Notes
1	1	Simran Sharma; Guide: Abhay Singh	India	12.17	Q, SB
2	5	Nagore Folgado García; Guide: Joan Varo Raga	Spain	12.35	q, PB
3	7	Clara Daniele Barros da Silva; Guide: Efaim Andrade	Brazil	12.66	
4	3	Uran Sawada; Guide: Ryuhei Shiokawa	Japan	12.90	
Source:				Wind: +0.8 m/s	

==== Heat 2 ====
Rank	Lane	Athlete	Nation	Time	Notes
1	5	Darlenys de la Cruz; Guide: Fary Sterlin Mejia Nunez	Dominican Republic	12.37	Q, SB
2	3	Viviane Ferreira Soares; Guide: Newton Viera de Almeida Jr	Brazil	12.73	
3	7	Yaqin Shen; Guide: Li Wen	China	12.78	
4	1	Heidilene Patricia Oliveira; Guide: Jailson Manuel Duarte Oliviera	Cape Verde	13.52	PB
Source:				Wind: +1.4 m/s	

==== Heat 3 ====
Rank	Lane	Athlete	Nation	Time	Notes
1	7	Katrin Mueller-Rottgardt; Guide: Noel-Phillippe Fiener	Germany	12.32	Q, SB
2	5	Melani Bergés Gámez; Guide: Sergio Diaz del Campo Velazquez	Spain	12.44	q, PB
3	1	Ni Made Arianti Putri; Guide: Aji Bayu Laksono	Indonesia	12.69	
4	3	Lorraine Gomes de Aguiar; Guide: Fernando Martins Ribiero Jr	Brazil	12.93	
Source:				Wind: -0.4 m/s	

==== Heat 4 ====
Rank	Lane	Athlete	Nation	Time	Notes
1	1	Omara Durand; Guide: Yuniol Kindelan Vargas	Cuba	11.87	Q, SB
2	5	Oksana Boturchuk; Guide: Mykyta Barbanov	Ukraine	12.33	q, SB
3	3	Alejandra Paola Pérez López; Guide: Markinzon Dan Manzanilla Velazquez	Venezuela	12.45	q, SB
4	7	Melissa Tillner; Guide: Victor Duarte Adorno	Paraguay	15.48	SB
Source:				Wind: -0.1 m/s	

=== Semi-finals ===
The semi-finals took place on 5 September 2024 with the first in each heat (Q) and the next 2 fastest (q) advancing to the final.

==== Heat 1 ====
Rank	Lane	Athlete	Nation	Time	Notes
1	4	Omara Durand; Guide: Yuniol Kindelan Vargas	Cuba	12.01	Q
2	8	Oksana Boturchuk; Guide: Mykyta Barbanov	Ukraine	12.36	q
3	6	Darlenys de la Cruz; Guide: Fary Sterlin Mejia Nunez	Dominican Republic	12.40	
4	2	Melani Bergés Gámez; Guide: Sergio Diaz del Campo Velazquez	Spain	12.50	
Source:				Wind: +0.5 m/s	

==== Heat 2 ====
Rank	Lane	Athlete	Nation	Time	Notes
1	4	Katrin Mueller-Rottgardt; Guide: Noel-Phillippe Fiener	Germany	12.26	Q, SB
2	6	Simran Sharma; Guide: Abhay Singh	India	12.33	q
3	2	Alejandra Paola Pérez López; Guide: Markinzon Dan Manzanilla Velazquez	Venezuela	12.52	
4	8	Nagore Folgado García; Guide: Joan Varo Raga	Spain	12.55	
Source:				Wind: 0.0 m/s	

=== Final ===
The final took place on 5 September 2024:

Rank	Lane	Athlete	Nation	Time	Notes
1st place, gold medalist(s)	5	Omara Durand; Guide: Yuniol Kindelan Vargas	Cuba	11.81	SB
2nd place, silver medalist(s)	1	Oksana Boturchuk; Guide: Mykyta Barbanov	Ukraine	12.17	SB
3rd place, bronze medalist(s)	3	Katrin Mueller-Rottgardt; Guide: Noel-Phillippe Fiener	Germany	12.26	SB
4	7	Simran Sharma; Guide: Abhay Singh	India	12.31	
Source:				Wind: 0.0 m/s	
