= Athletics at the 2020 Summer Paralympics – Women's 400 metres T12 =

Women's 400 metres T12 at the XVI Paralympic Games
- Venue: Tokyo National Stadium
- Dates: 30 August 2021 (heats); 31 August 2021 (final)
- Competitors: 10 from 8 nations
- Winning time: 52.58

Medalists
1st place, gold medalist(s)		Omara Durand	Cuba
2nd place, silver medalist(s)		Oxana Boturchuk	Ukraine
3rd place, bronze medalist(s)		Alejandra Paola Perez Lopez	Venezuela

The women's 400 metres T12 event at the 2020 Summer Paralympics in Tokyo, took place between 30 and 31 August 2021.

The T12 category is for athletes with visual impairment. Athletes in this category will generally have some residual sight, the ability to recognise the shape of a hand at a distance of 2 metres and the ability to perceive clearly will be no more than 2/60. T12 athletes commonly run with guides.

== Records ==
Prior to the competition, the existing records were as follows:

World Record	Omara Durand (CUB)	51.77	Rio de Janeiro, Brazil	17 September 2016
Paralympic Record	Omara Durand (CUB)	51.77	Rio de Janeiro, Brazil	17 September 2016

Area	Time	Athlete	Nation
Africa	53.89	Edmilsa Governo	Mozambique
America	51.77 WR	Omara Durand	Cuba
Asia	58.45	Zhou Guohua	China
Europe	53.14	Oxana Boturchuk	Ukraine
Oceania	Vacant		

== Results ==
=== Heats ===
Heat 1 took place on 30 August 2021, at 20:51:

Rank	Lane	Name	Nationality	Time	Notes
1	7	Alejandra Paola Perez Lopez	Venezuela	56.95	Q, PB
2	5	Izaskun Osés Ayúcar	Spain	1:00.50	SB
	1	Katrin Mueller-Rottgardt	Germany	DQ	WPA 17.8
	3	Ketyla Teodoro	Brazil	DQ	WPA 17.8

Heat 2 took place on 30 August 2021, at 20:59:

Rank	Lane	Name	Nationality	Time	Notes
1	3	Omara Durand	Cuba	55.33	Q, SB
2	7	Daniela Velasco	Mexico	1:00.39	SB
3	5	Fatima Ezzahra El Idrissi	Morocco	1:01.25	SB

Heat 3 took place on 30 August 2021, at 21:07:

Rank	Lane	Name	Nationality	Time	Notes
1	5	Oxana Boturchuk	Ukraine	56.49	Q, SB
2	7	Greilyz Greimal Villarroel Hernandez	Venezuela	58.71	q, SB
3	3	Sara Martínez	Spain	1:07.18	

=== Final ===
The final took place on 31 August 2021, at 11:36:

Rank	Lane	Name	Nationality	Time	Notes
1st place, gold medalist(s)	5	Omara Durand	Cuba	52.58	SB
2nd place, silver medalist(s)	3	Oxana Boturchuk	Ukraine	55.33	SB
3rd place, bronze medalist(s)	7	Alejandra Paola Perez Lopez	Venezuela	57.06	
4	1	Greilyz Greimal Villarroel Hernandez	Venezuela	57.69	PB
