= Athletics at the 2020 Summer Paralympics – Women's 200 metres T12 =

Women's 200 metres T12 at the XVI Paralympic Games
- Venue: Tokyo National Stadium
- Dates: 3 September 2021 (heats); 4 September 2021 (final)
- Competitors: 11 from 8 nations
- Winning time: 23.02

Medalists
1st place, gold medalist(s)		Omara Durand	Cuba
2nd place, silver medalist(s)		Oxana Boturchuk	Ukraine
3rd place, bronze medalist(s)		Anna Kulinich-Sorokina	RPC

The women's 200 metres T12 event at the 2020 Summer Paralympics in Tokyo took place between 3 and 4 September 2021.

The T12 category is for athletes with visual impairment. Athletes in this category will generally have some residual sight, the ability to recognise the shape of a hand at a distance of 2 metres and the ability to perceive clearly will be no more than 2/60. T12 athletes commonly run with guides.

== Records ==
Prior to the competition, the existing records were as follows:

World Record	Omara Durand (CUB)	23.03	Doha, Qatar	25 October 2015
Paralympic Record	Omara Durand (CUB)	23.05	Rio de Janeiro, Brazil	12 September 2016

Area	Time	Athlete	Nation
Africa	25.72	Evalina Alexandre	Angola
America	23.03 WR	Omara Durand	Cuba
Asia	24.66	Zhou Guohua	China
Europe	23.65	Oxana Boturchuk	Ukraine
Oceania	31.80	Record Mark	

== Results ==
=== Heats ===
Heat 1 took place on 3 September 2021, at 19:50:

Rank	Lane	Name	Nationality	Time	Notes
1	7	Oxana Boturchuk	Ukraine	24.85	Q, SB
2	1	Greilyz Villarroel	Venezuela	25.86	SB
3	5	Nagore Folgado García	Spain	27.27	

Heat 2 took place on 3 September 2021, at 19:57:

Rank	Lane	Name	Nationality	Time	Notes
1	5	Anna Kulinich-Sorokina	RPC	25.38	Q, SB
2	3	Darlenys de la Cruz Severino	Dominican Republic	25.79	
3	1	Liang Yanfen	China	26.56	SB
4	7	Viviane Ferreira Soares	Brazil	26.61	SB

Heat 3 took place on 3 September 2021, at 20:04:

Rank	Lane	Name	Nationality	Time	Notes
1	5	Omara Durand	Cuba	23.40	Q, SB
2	3	Alejandra Paola Pérez López	Venezuela	25.32	q, PB
3	1	Alba García Falagán	Spain	26.45	
4	7	Ketyla Teodoro	Brazil	26.74	SB

=== Final ===
The final took place on 4 September, at 19:39:

Rank	Lane	Name	Nationality	Time	Notes
1st place, gold medalist(s)	3	Omara Durand	Cuba	23.02	WR
2nd place, silver medalist(s)	5	Oxana Boturchuk	Ukraine	24.48	SB
3rd place, bronze medalist(s)	1	Anna Kulinich-Sorokina	RPC	24.85	SB
4	7	Alejandra Paola Pérez López	Venezuela	25.27	PB
