= Athletics at the 2020 Summer Paralympics – Women's 400 metres T13 =

Women's 400 metres T13 at the XVI Paralympic Games
- Venue: Tokyo National Stadium
- Dates: 2 September 2021 (heats); 4 September 2021 (final)
- Competitors: 17 from 14 nations
- Winning time: 55.00

Medalists
1st place, gold medalist(s)		Lamiya Valiyeva	Azerbaijan
2nd place, silver medalist(s)		Adiaratou Iglesias Forneiro	Spain
3rd place, bronze medalist(s)		Kym Crosby	United States

The women's 400 metres T13 event at the 2020 Summer Paralympics in Tokyo, took place between 2–4 September 2021.

The T13 category is for athletes with a moderate visual impairment. Athletes in this category have a variety of visual impairments, but can typically recognize contours from a distance of 2 to 6 metres. Athletes in this category do not typically require a guide.

== Records ==
Prior to the competition, the existing records were as follows:

World record	Marla Runyan (USA)	54.46	Los Angeles, United States	3 January 1995
Paralympic record	Omara Durand (CUB)	55.12	London, United Kingdom	3 September 2012

Area	Time	Athlete	Nation
Africa	55.56	Sanaa Benhama	Morocco
America	54.46 WR	Marla Runyan	United States
Asia	58.08	Mana Sasaki	Japan
Europe	55.70	Adiaratou Iglesias Forneiro	Spain
Oceania	1:05.00	Lara Hollow-Williams	Australia

== Results ==
=== Heats ===
Heat 1 took place on 2 September 2021, at 21:21:

Rank	Lane	Name	Nationality	Time	Notes
1	8	Nantenin Keïta	France	57.40	Q, SB
2	3	Erin Kerkhoff	United States	58.30	Q
3	4	Mariia Ulianenko	RPC	58.56	PB
4	7	Peace Oroma	Uganda	59.09	PB
5	5	Taonele Banda	Malawi	1:11.74	SB
	6	Leilia Adzhametova	Ukraine	DNS	

Heat 2 took place on 2 September 2021, at 21:29:

Rank	Lane	Name	Nationality	Time	Notes
1	6	Edmilsa Governo	Mozambique	55.50	Q, AR
2	3	Iuliia Ianovskaia	Azerbaijan	56.55	Q, PB
3	4	Rayane Soares da Silva	Brazil	59.54	
4	8	Taylor Talbot	United States	1:04.76	
5	5	Monica Munga	Zambia	1:05.79	PB
6	7	Melissa Calvo	Costa Rica	1:09.22	

Heat 3 took place on 2 September 2021, at 21:37:

Rank	Lane	Name	Nationality	Time	Notes
1	4	Adiaratou Iglesias Forneiro	Spain	55.70	Q, =AR
2	6	Lamiya Valiyeva	Azerbaijan	55.71	Q, PB
3	5	Kym Crosby	United States	58.14	q
4	3	Mana Sasaki	Japan	58.48	q, SB
5	7	Gloria Majaga	Botswana	1:04.18	

=== Final ===
The final took place on 4 September 2021, at 10:08:

Rank	Lane	Name	Nationality	Time	Notes
1st place, gold medalist(s)	6	Lamiya Valiyeva	Azerbaijan	55.00	GR
2nd place, silver medalist(s)	7	Adiaratou Iglesias Forneiro	Spain	55.53	PB
3rd place, bronze medalist(s)	3	Kym Crosby	United States	56.79	PB
4	4	Nantenin Keïta	France	57.17	SB
5	8	Iuliia Ianovskaia	Azerbaijan	57.18	
6	5	Edmilsa Governo	Mozambique	57.68	
7	2	Mana Sasaki	Japan	58.05	AR
8	9	Erin Kerkhoff	United States	58.06	PB
