= Athletics at the 2020 Summer Paralympics – Women's 100 metres T13 =

Women's 100 metres T13 at the XVI Paralympic Games
- Venue: Tokyo National Stadium
- Dates: 31 August 2021 (final)
- Competitors: 18 from 14 nations
- Winning time: 11.96

Medalists
1st place, gold medalist(s)		Adiaratou Iglesias Forneiro	Spain
2nd place, silver medalist(s)		Lamiya Valiyeva	Azerbaijan
3rd place, bronze medalist(s)		Kym Crosby	United States

The women's 100 metres T13 event at the 2020 Summer Paralympics in Tokyo, took place on 31 August 2021.

The T13 category is for athletes with a moderate visual impairment. Athletes in this category have a variety of visual impairments, but can typically recognize contours from a distance of 2 to 6 metres. Athletes in this category do not typically require a guide.

== Records ==
Prior to the competition, the existing records were as follows:

World Record	Leilia Adzhametova (UKR)	11.79	Rio de Janeiro, Brazil	11 September 2016
Paralympic Record	Leilia Adzhametova (UKR)	11.79	Rio de Janeiro, Brazil	11 September 2016

Area	Time	Athlete	Nation
Africa	11.89	Ilse Hayes	South Africa
America	11.99	Omara Durand	Cuba
Asia	12.25	Zhu Lin	China
Europe	11.79 WR	Leilia Adzhametova	Ukraine
Oceania	13.03	Courtney Harbeck	Australia

== Results ==
=== Heats ===
Heat 1 took place on 31 August 2021, at 10:30:

Rank	Lane	Name	Nationality	Time	Notes
1	5	Lamiya Valiyeva	Azerbaijan	12.09	Q
2	3	Rayane Soares Da Silva	Brazil	12.39	Q
3	6	Johanna Pretorius	South Africa	12.41	q, =PB
4	7	Mana Sasaki	Japan	12.96	PB
5	4	Taylor Talbot	United States	13.33	
6	8	Melissa Calvo Hernández	Costa Rica	14.25	

Heat 2 took place on 31 August 2021, at 10:38:

Rank	Lane	Name	Nationality	Time	Notes
1	3	Kym Crosby	United States	12.07	Q
2	5	Leilia Adzhametova	Ukraine	12.38	Q
3	4	Iuliia Ianovskaia	Azerbaijan	12.41	q, PB
4	7	Janne Sophie Engeleiter	Germany	12.42	PB
5	6	Simran Sharma	India	12.69	SB
6	8	Edmilsa Governo	Mozambique	12.71	PB

Heat 3 took place on 31 August 2021, at 10:46:

Rank	Lane	Name	Nationality	Time	Notes
1	4	Elena Chebanu	Azerbaijan	12.16	Q, PB
2	5	Adiaratou Iglesias Forneiro	Spain	12.20	Q
3	8	Putri Aulia	Indonesia	12.55	SB
4	6	Orla Comerford	Ireland	12.87	
5	3	Erin Kerkhoff	United States	12.99	
6	7	Peace Oroma	Uganda	13.17	PB

=== Final ===
The final took place on 31 August 2021, at 20:10:

Rank	Lane	Name	Nationality	Time	Notes
1st place, gold medalist(s)	6	Adiaratou Iglesias Forneiro	Spain	11.96	
2nd place, silver medalist(s)	4	Lamiya Valiyeva	Azerbaijan	11.99	PB
3rd place, bronze medalist(s)	5	Kym Crosby	United States	12.08	
4	2	Iuliia Ianovskaia	Azerbaijan	12.30	PB
5	3	Johanna Pretorius	South Africa	12.33	PB
6	9	Leilia Adzhametova	Ukraine	12.37	
7	7	Elena Chebanu	Azerbaijan	12.41	
8	8	Rayane Soares Da Silva	Brazil	12.52	
