= Athletics at the 2020 Summer Paralympics – Women's 100 metres T12 =

Women's 100 metres T12 at the XVI Paralympic Games
- Venue: Tokyo National Stadium
- Dates: 1 September 2021 (heats); 2 September 2021 (final)
- Competitors: 13 from 11 nations
- Winning time: 11.49

Medalists
1st place, gold medalist(s)		Omara Durand	Cuba
2nd place, silver medalist(s)		Oxana Boturchuk	Ukraine
3rd place, bronze medalist(s)		Liang Yanfen	China

The women's 100 metres T12 event at the 2020 Summer Paralympics in Tokyo, took place between 1 and 2 September 2021.

The T12 category is for athletes with visual impairment. Athletes in this category will generally have some residual sight, the ability to recognise the shape of a hand at a distance of 2 metres and the ability to perceive clearly will be no more than 2/60. T12 athletes commonly run with guides.

== Records ==
Prior to the competition, the existing records were as follows:

World record	Omara Durand (CUB)	11.40	Rio de Janeiro, Brazil	9 September 2016
Paralympic record	Omara Durand (CUB)	11.40	Rio de Janeiro, Brazil	9 September 2016

Area	Time	Athlete	Nation
Africa	12.35	Edmilsa Governo	Mozambique
America	11.40 WR	Omara Durand	Cuba
Asia	11.91	Zhou Guohua	China
Europe	11.79	Elena Chebanu	Azerbaijan
Oceania	15.00	Record Mark	

== Results ==
=== Heats ===
Heat 1 took place on 1 September 2021, at 19:37:

Rank	Lane	Name	Nationality	Time	Notes
1	5	Oxana Boturchuk	Ukraine	12.04	Q, SB
2	3	Liang Yanfen	China	12.39	q, SB
3	1	Melissa Tillner	Paraguay	14.77	PB
4	7	Pamela Shumba	Zimbabwe	15.43	PB

Heat 2 took place on 1 September 2021, at 19:45:

Rank	Lane	Name	Nationality	Time	Notes
1	5	Omara Durand	Cuba	11.70	Q, SB
2	3	Greilyz Villarroel	Venezuela	12.57	q, SB
3	7	Alba García Falagán	Spain	12.85	

Heat 3 took place on 1 September 2021, at 19:53:

Rank	Lane	Name	Nationality	Time	Notes
1	7	Darlenys de La Cruz Severino	Dominican Republic	12.55	Q, PB
2	3	Uran Sawada	Japan	12.71	q, SB
	5	Katrin Mueller-Rottgardt	Germany	DNS	

Heat 4 took place on 1 September 2021, at 20:01:

Rank	Lane	Name	Nationality	Time	Notes
1	3	Viviane Ferreira Soares	Brazil	12.62	Q, SB
2	5	Nagore Folgado García	Spain	12.77	q
	7	Alejandra Paola Perez Lopez	Venezuela	DQ	WPA 7.10.4

=== Semi-finals ===
Semi-final 1 took place on 2 September 2021, at 11:06:

Rank	Lane	Name	Nationality	Time	Notes
1	3	Omara Durand	Cuba	11.59	Q, SB
2	7	Liang Yanfen	China	12.47	q
3	5	Viviane Ferreira Soares	Brazil	12.81	
4	1	Nagore Folgado García	Spain	13.02	

Semi-final 2 took place on 2 September 2021, at 11:14:

Rank	Lane	Name	Nationality	Time	Notes
1	5	Oxana Boturchuk	Ukraine	12.28	Q
2	3	Darlenys de La Cruz Severino	Dominican Republic	12.45	q, PB
3	7	Greilyz Villarroel	Venezuela	12.68	
4	1	Uran Sawada	Japan	12.81	

=== Final ===
The final took place on 2 September 2021, at 19:20:

Rank	Lane	Name	Nationality	Time	Notes
1st place, gold medalist(s)	3	Omara Durand	Cuba	11.49	SB
2nd place, silver medalist(s)	5	Oxana Boturchuk	Ukraine	12.03	SB
3rd place, bronze medalist(s)	1	Liang Yanfen	China	12.51	
4	7	Darlenys de La Cruz Severino	Dominican Republic	12.53	
