= Athletics at the 2024 Summer Paralympics – Women's 100 metres T13 =

Women's 100 metres T13 at the XVII Paralympic Games
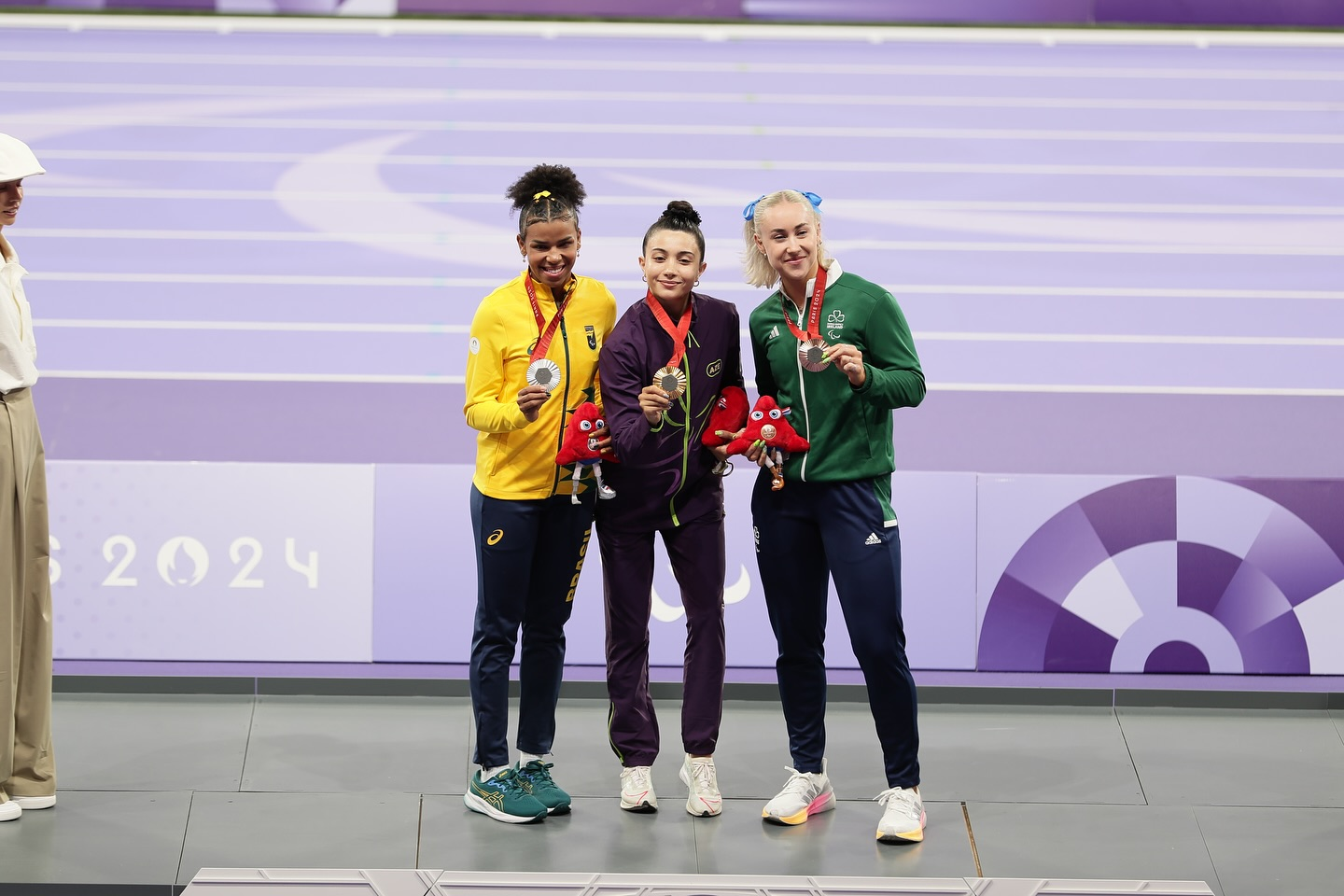
- Awarding ceremony
- Venue: Stade de France
- Dates: 3 September 2024
- Competitors: 13 from 11 nations
- Winning time: 11.76

Medalists
1st place, gold medalist(s)		Lamiya Valiyeva	Azerbaijan
2nd place, silver medalist(s)		Rayane Soares da Silva	Brazil
3rd place, bronze medalist(s)		Orla Comerford	Ireland

100 metres at the 2024 Summer Paralympics
Men · T11 · T12 · T13 · T34 · T35 · T36 · T37 · T38 · T44 · T47 · T51 · T52 · T53 · T54 · T63 · T64
Women · T11 · T12 · T13 · T34 · T35 · T36 · T37 · T38 · T47 · T53 · T54 · T63 · T64

The women's 100 metres T13 event at the 2024 Summer Paralympics in Paris, took place on September 3rd, 2024.

The T13 category is for athletes with a moderate visual impairment. Athletes in this category have a variety of visual impairments, but can typically recognize contours from a distance of 2 to 6 metres. Athletes in this category do not typically require a guide.

== Records ==
Prior to the competition, the existing records were as follows:

World record	Leilia Adzhametova (UKR)	11.79	(Brazil) Rio de Janeiro	11 September 2016
Paralympic record	Leilia Adzhametova (UKR)	11.79	(Brazil) Rio de Janeiro	11 September 2016

Area	Time		Athlete	Location	Date
Africa	11.89		(South Africa) Ilse Hayes	(Brazil) São Paulo	23 April 2015
America	11.99		(Cuba) Omara Durand	(Mexico) Guadalajara	17 November 2011
Asia	12.25		(China) Zhu Lin	(China) Beijing	14 April 2014
Europe	11.79	WR	(Ukraine) Leilia Adzhametova	(Brazil) Rio de Janeiro	11 September 2016
Oceania	13.03		(Australia) Courtney Harbeck	(United States) Los Angeles	3 January 1995

== Results ==
=== Round 1 ===
Round 1 took place on 3 September 2024 with the first 3 in each heat (Q) and the next 2 fastest (q) advancing to the Final.

==== Heat 1 ====
Rank	Lane	Athlete	Nation	Time	Notes
1	4	Lamiya Valiyeva	Azerbaijan	11.81	Q, PB
2	6	Rayane Soares da Silva	Brazil	11.90	Q, AR
3	3	Adiaratou Iglesias Forneiro	Spain	12.46	Q, SB
4	2	Erin Kerkhoff	United States	12.70	q, =PB
5	5	Gloria Majaga	Botswana	13.12	
6	7	Candela Cerrudo	Argentina	13.51	PB
7	8	Rahinatou Mone	Burkina Faso	13.86	PB
Source:				Wind: +0.1 m/s	

==== Heat 2 ====
Rank	Lane	Athlete	Nation	Time	Notes
1	8	Orla Comerford	Ireland	12.02	Q
2	3	Bianca Borgella	Canada	12.15	Q
3	6	Kym Crosby	United States	12.41	Q
4	4	Gabriela Mendonca Ferriera	Brazil	12.76	q
5	5	Nantenin Keita	France	12.85	SB
6	7	Zara Temmink	Netherlands	12.89	
Source:				Wind: +0.8 m/s	

=== Final ===
The final took place on 3 September 2024:

Rank	Lane	Athlete	Nation	Time	Notes
1st place, gold medalist(s)	6	Lamiya Valiyeva	Azerbaijan	11.76	WR
2nd place, silver medalist(s)	5	Rayane Soares da Silva	Brazil	11.78	AR
3rd place, bronze medalist(s)	4	Orla Comerford	Ireland	11.94	
4	8	Kym Crosby	United States	12.40	
5	3	Adiaratou Iglesias Forneiro	Spain	12.51	
6	9	Gabriela Mendonca Ferriera	Brazil	12.67	
7	2	Erin Kerkhoff	United States	12.75	
8	7	Bianca Borgella	Canada	25.11	
Source:				Wind: +0.2 m/s	
