= Athletics at the 2016 Summer Paralympics – Women's 200 metres T12 =

Women's 200 metres T12 at the XV Paralympic Games
- Venue: Estádio Olímpico João Havelange
- Dates: 12 September 2016
- Competitors: 7 from 7 nations

Medalists
1st place, gold medalist(s)		Omara Durand	Cuba
2nd place, silver medalist(s)		Oksana Boturchuk	Ukraine
3rd place, bronze medalist(s)		Elena Chebanu	Azerbaijan

The T12 category is for athletes with visual impairment. Athletes in this category will generally have some residual sight, the ability to recognise the shape of a hand at a distance of 2 metres and the ability to perceive clearly will be no more than 2/60. T12 athletes commonly run with guides.

The Athletics at the 2016 Summer Paralympics – Women's 200 metres T12 event at the 2016 Paralympic Games took place on 12 September 2016, at the Estádio Olímpico João Havelange.

== Heats ==
=== Heat 1 ===
19:28 11 September 2016:

Rank	Lane	Bib	Name	Nationality	Reaction	Time	Notes
1	5	63	Elena Chebanu	Azerbaijan	0.189	24.16	Q
2	1	371	Katrin Mueller-Rottgardt	Germany	0.150	24.73	q
3	3	102	Alice Correa	Brazil	0.161	25.12	
4	7	682	Joyleen Jeffrey	Papua New Guinea	0.209	32.78	

=== Heat 2 ===
19:35 11 September 2016:

Rank	Lane	Bib	Name	Nationality	Reaction	Time	Notes
1	3	242	Omara Durand	Cuba	0.170	23.67	Q
2	7	872	Oksana Boturchuk	Ukraine	0.240	24.02	q
3	5	937	Greilyz Villarroel	Venezuela	0.152	25.88	

== Final ==
10:57 12 September 2016:

Rank	Lane	Bib	Name	Nationality	Reaction	Time	Notes
1st place, gold medalist(s)	5	242	Omara Durand	Cuba	0.182	23.05	
2nd place, silver medalist(s)	7	872	Oksana Boturchuk	Ukraine	0.245	23.65	
3rd place, bronze medalist(s)	3	63	Elena Chebanu	Azerbaijan	0.176	23.80	
4	1	371	Katrin Mueller-Rottgardt	Germany	0.162	24.71	
