= Mykyta Barabanov =

Ukrainian sprinter (born 2001)

Personal information
- Nationality: Ukrainian
- Born: 26 May 2001 (age 24)

Sport
- Sport: Athletics
- Event: 400 metres

Mykyta Barabanov (Ukrainian: Микита Сергійович Барабанов; born 26 May 2001) is a Ukrainian athlete. He competed in the mixed 4 × 400 metres relay event at the 2020 Summer Olympics held in Tokyo, Japan. He also competed as Oxana Boturchuk's sighted guide in the women's 100 metres T12 and women's 400 metres T12 events at the 2020 Summer Paralympics, also held in Tokyo, Japan.
