= Athletics at the 2016 Summer Paralympics – Women's 400 metres T12 =

Women's 400 metres T12 at the XV Paralympic Games
- Venue: Estádio Olímpico João Havelange
- Dates: 17 September 2016
- Competitors: 10 from 9 nations

Medalists
1st place, gold medalist(s)		Omara Durand	Cuba
2nd place, silver medalist(s)		Oksana Boturchuk	Ukraine
3rd place, bronze medalist(s)		Edmilsa Governo	Mozambique

The T12 category is for athletes with visual impairment. Athletes in this category will generally have some residual sight, the ability to recognise the shape of a hand at a distance of 2 metres and the ability to perceive clearly will be no more than 2/60. T12 athletes commonly run with guides.

The Athletics at the 2016 Summer Paralympics – Women's 400 metres T12 event at the 2016 Paralympic Games took place on 17 September 2016, at the Estádio Olímpico João Havelange.

== Heats ==
=== Heat 1 ===
11:03 15 September 2016:

Rank	Lane	Bib	Name	Nationality	Reaction	Time	Notes
1	7	273	Melani Berges Gamez	Spain	0.161	57.52	Q
2	3	834	Najah Chouaya	Tunisia	0.252	59.40	
3	5	560	Daniela Eugenia Velasco Maldonado	Mexico	0.253	1:01.99	

=== Heat 2 ===
11:09 15 September 2016:

Rank	Lane	Bib	Name	Nationality	Reaction	Time	Notes
1	7	242	Omara Durand	Cuba	0.190	52.90	Q
2	5	63	Elena Chebanu	Azerbaijan	0.185	56.53	
3	3	937	Greilyz Villarroel	Venezuela	0.144	59.71	

=== Heat 3 ===
11:15 15 September 2016:

Rank	Lane	Bib	Name	Nationality	Reaction	Time	Notes
1	1	872	Oksana Boturchuk	Ukraine	0.202	54.47	Q
2	5	586	Edmilsa Governo	Mozambique	0.176	54.94	q
3	3	277	Izaskun Oses Ayucar	Spain		59.80	
	7	173	Yaqin Shen	China			DSQ

== Final ==
18:25 17 September 2016:

Rank	Lane	Bib	Name	Nationality	Reaction	Time	Notes
1st place, gold medalist(s)	3	242	Omara Durand	Cuba	0.178	51.77	
2nd place, silver medalist(s)	5	872	Oksana Boturchuk	Ukraine	0.271	53.14	
3rd place, bronze medalist(s)	1	586	Edmilsa Governo	Mozambique	0.173	53.89	
4	7	273	Melani Berges Gamez	Spain	0.155	57.66	
