= Volodymyr Burakov =

Ukrainian sprinter (born 1985)

Personal information
- Born: 6 May 1985 (age 41)
- Height: 1.83 m (6 ft 0 in)
- Weight: 71 kg (157 lb)

Sport
- Sport: Athletics
- Event: 400 m
Medal record
Representing Ukraine
Paralympic Games
Silver medal – second place	2016 Rio de Janeiro	200 m – T12
Silver medal – second place	2016 Rio de Janeiro	400 m – T12

Volodymyr Burakov (Ukrainian: Володимир Бураков; born 6 May 1985) is a Ukrainian sprinter competing primarily in the 400 metres. He represented his country in the 4 × 400 metres relay at the 2013 World Championships without qualifying for the final. In addition, he finished fourth individually at the 2013 European Indoor Championships.

In 2016 he won two silver medals, in 200m and 400m sprints, at the Rio Paralympics, as the sighted guide for visually impaired Ukrainian athlete Oksana Boturchuk.

== International competitions ==
Year	Competition	Venue	Position	Event	Notes
Representing the Ukraine
2010	European Championships	Barcelona, Spain	27th (h)	400 m	47.03
2010	European Championships	Barcelona, Spain	9th (h)	4x400 m relay	3:05.51
2012	World Indoor Championships	Istanbul, Turkey	6th (h)	4x400 m relay	3:08.92
2012	European Championships	Helsinki, Finland	7th	4x400 m relay	3:04.56
2013	European Indoor Championships	Gothenburg, Sweden	4th	400 m	46.79
2013	World Championships	Moscow, Russia	21st (h)	4x400 m relay	3:04.98
2014	European Championships	Zürich, Switzerland	–	4x400 m relay	DQ
2016	European Championships	Amsterdam, Netherlands	6th	4x400 m relay	3:04.45

== Personal bests ==
Outdoor

- 200 metres – 21.25 (0.0 m/s, Yalta 2008)
- 400 metres – 46.07 (Yalta 2012)

Indoor

- 400 metres – 46.70 (Sumy 2013)
