= Cuba at the 2020 Summer Paralympics =

- IPC code: CUB
- NPC: Comité Paralimpico Cubano

in Tokyo
- Competitors: 16 in 7 sports
- Flag bearers: Omara Durand & Lorenzo Perez Escalona
- Medals Ranked 35th: Gold 4 Silver 1 Bronze 1 Total 6

Summer Paralympics appearances (overview)
- 1992; 1996; 2000; 2004; 2008; 2012; 2016; 2020; 2024

Cuba competed at the 2020 Summer Paralympics in Tokyo, Japan, from 24 August to 5 September 2021.

== Medalists ==
Medal	Name	Sport	Event	Date
Gold	Robiel Yankiel Sol Cervantes	Athletics	Men's long jump T47	31 August
Gold	Omara Durand	Athletics	Women's 400 metres T12	31 August
Gold	Omara Durand	Athletics	Women's 100 metres T12	2 September
Gold	Omara Durand	Athletics	Women's 200 metres T12	4 September
Silver	Leinier Savon Pineda	Athletics	Men's long jump T12	30 August
Bronze	Leonardo Diaz Aldana	Athletics	Men's discus throw F56	30 August

== Competitors ==
Sport	Men	Women	Total
Athletics	6	2	8
Judo	2	0	2
Cycling	1	0	1
Powerlifting	1	1	2
Shooting	0	1	1
Swimming	1	0	1
Table Tennis	1	0	1
Total	12	4	16

== Athletics ==
Two Cuban athlete (Uliser Aguilera Cruz& Omara Durand) successfully to break through the qualifications for the 2020 Paralympics after breaking the qualification limit.

DQ: Disqualified | SB: Season Best | Q: Qualified by place or standard based on overall position after heats | DNM: Did not mark | DNA: Did not advance | N/A: Not available, stage was not contested | PB: Personal Best | WR: World Record | PR: Paralympic Record | AR: Area Record

=== Track ===
Athlete	Event	Heats		Final	
Athlete	Event	Result	Rank	Result	Rank
Leinier Savon	Men's 100m T12	10.91	2	DNA	5
Omara Durand Guide: Yuniol Kindelan	Women's 100m T12	11.70 SB	1 Q	11.49 SB	Gold medal
Omara Durand Guide: Yuniol Kindelan	Women's 200m T12	23.40 SB	1 Q	23.02 WR	Gold medal
Omara Durand Guide: Yuniol Kindelan	Women's 400m T12	55.33	1 Q	52.58 SB	Gold medal

=== Field ===
Athlete	Event	Final	
Athlete	Event	Result	Rank
Leinier Savon	Men's long jump T12	7.16 AR	Silver medal
Ángel Jiménez	Men's long jump T12	6.25	9
Robiel Sol	Men's long jump T47	7.46 PR	Gold medal
Noralvis de Las Heras	Women's discus throw F64	30.62 SB	8
Leonardo Díaz	Men's discus throw F56	43.36 SB	Bronze medal
Guillermo Varona	Men's javelin throw F57	63.30 AR	4
Ulicer Aguilera	Men's javelin throw F13	59.89 AR	4

== Cycling ==
Cuba sent one male cyclist after successfully getting a slot in the 2018 UCI Nations Ranking Allocation quota for the Americas.

FADT: Finish After Deadline Time

Athlete	Event	Time	Rank
Damian López Alfonso	Road race C1-3	FADT	35
Damian López Alfonso	Time trial C1	30:45.20	10
Damian López Alfonso	Men's C1 1000m Time Trial	1:30.047	22

== Judo ==
Athlete	Event	Preliminaries	Quarterfinals	Semifinals	Repechage First round	Repechage Final	Final / BM	
Athlete	Event	Opposition Result	Opposition Result	Opposition Result	Opposition Result	Opposition Result	Opposition Result	Rank
Gerardo Rodriguez	Men's −81 kg	BYE	Villalobos (PER) L 10IPP-0	Karomatov (UZB) L 0–10IPP	BYE	Solovey (UKR) L 0s1-1s2	DNA	7
Yordani Fernandez	Men's +100 kg	BYE	Araujo (BRA) W 10IPP–0	Sharipov (UZB) L 0–1s2	BYE	Masaki (JPN) L 10IPP-0s1	Choi (KOR) L 0-10s1	5

== Powerlifting ==
Athlete	Event	Total lifted	Rank
Leidy Rodriguez	Women's -41 kg	DNM	9
Oniger Drake	Men's −88 kg	181	7

== Shooting ==
Athlete	Event	Qualification 1		Qualification 2		Final		
Athlete	Event	Score	Rank	Score	Rank	Score	Total	Rank
Yenigladys Suarez Echevarria	P2 – Women's 10m air pistol SH1	N/A		542-9X	15	Did not advance		
Yenigladys Suarez Echevarria	Mix 25 metre air pistol SH1	272-4x	26	539-5x	28	Did not advance		

== Swimming ==
One Cuban swimmer has successfully entered the paralympic slot after breaking the MQS.

Athlete	Event	Heats		Final	
Athlete	Event	Time	Rank	Time	Rank
Lorenzo Perez Escalona	Men's 50m freestyle S7	32.27	7	DNA	13
Lorenzo Perez Escalona	Men's 100m freestyle S6	1:08.62	4	DNA	9
Lorenzo Perez Escalona	Men's 400m freestyle S6	5:26.57	4 Q	5:30.42	8

== Table tennis ==
Cuba entered one athletes into the table tennis competition at the games. Yunier Fernández qualified from the 2019 Parapan American Games which was held in Lima, Peru.

Men

Athlete	Event	Group Stage			Round 1	Quarterfinals	Semifinals	Final	
Athlete	Event	Opposition Result	Opposition Result	Rank	Opposition Result	Opposition Result	Opposition Result	Opposition Result	Rank
Yunier Fernández	Individual C1	Kim Hyeon-uk (KOR); L 0-3	Silvio Keller (SUI); W 3-0	2 Q	Joo Young-dae (KOR); L 0-3	Did not advance			17

== See also ==
- Cuba at the Paralympics
- Cuba at the 2020 Summer Olympics
