= Mozambique at the 2024 Summer Paralympics =

- IPC code: MOZ
- NPC: Paralympic Committee Mozambique

in Paris, France August 28, 2024 – September 8, 2024
- Competitors: 1 in 1 sport
- Flag bearer: Edmilsa Governo
- Medals: Gold 0 Silver 0 Bronze 0 Total 0

Summer Paralympics appearances (overview)
- 2012; 2016; 2020; 2024

Mozambique competed at the 2024 Summer Paralympics in Paris, France, from 28 August to 8 September 2024. This was the nation's fourth time competing at the Summer Paralympic Games after it made its debut at the 2012 Summer Paralympics. The delegation consisted solely of Edmilsa Governo in athletics.

== Competitors ==
The following is the list of number of competitors in the Games.

Sport	Men	Women	Total
Athletics	0	1	1
Total	0	1	1

== Athletics ==
Athlete	Event	Heat		Final	
Athlete	Event	Result	Rank	Result	Rank
Edmilsa Governo	Women's 400 metres T13	DNS		Did not advance	

== See also ==
- Mozambique at the 2024 Summer Olympics
- Mozambique at the Paralympics
