= 2016 Summer Paralympics medal table =

List of medals won by Paralympic delegations

2016 Summer Paralympics medals
- Location: Rio de Janeiro, Brazil

Highlights
- Most gold medals: China (107)
- Most total medals: China (239)
- Medalling NPCs: 83

The medal table of the 2016 Summer Paralympics ranks the participating National Paralympic Committees (NPCs) by the number of gold medals won by their athletes during the competition. The 2016 Paralympics was the fifteenth Games to be held, a quadrennial competition open to athletes with physical and intellectual disabilities. The games were held in Rio de Janeiro, Brazil from 7 September to 18 September.

Athletes from 63 NPCs won at least one gold medal, with a total of 83 having won at least one medal of any colour. Athletes from Cape Verde, Georgia, Mozambique, Qatar, Uganda, and Vietnam won their first Paralympic medals. Of those nations, the National Olympic Committee of Cape Verde had had never won an Olympic medal until 2024. Kazakhstan won their first medals at the Summer Paralympics, having previously won a silver medal at the Winter Paralympic Games. Georgia, Kazakhstan, Malaysia, Uzbekistan, and Vietnam won their first Paralympic gold medals.

For the fourth consecutive games, China topped the table, with 107 gold medals and 239 in total; their best result of any games to date. Great Britain followed in second place, with 64 gold and 147 total medals. Ukraine finished in third place, with 41 gold and 117 total medals, its most medals and highest finish to date.

== Medal table ==
The ranking in this table is based on information provided by the International Paralympic Committee (IPC) and is consistent with IPC convention in its published medal tables. By default, the table is ordered by the number of gold medals the athletes from a nation have won (in this context, a nation is an entity represented by a National Paralympic Committee). The number of silver medals is next considered, followed by the number of bronze medals. If nations remain tied, they are ranked equally and listed alphabetically by IPC country code.

In the judo competition, an additional thirteen bronze medals were awarded as the winners of the two repechage brackets (for those who lost to the eventual finalists) each received a bronze medal.

The swimming also saw multiple instances of the same medals being awarded, in the Men's 100m Backstroke S11, both Wojciech Makowski and Bradley Snyder swam a dead heat in the final and were both awarded a silver medal, resulting in no bronze medal being given that for event, in the Men's 100m Breaststroke SB13, both Oleksii Fedyna and Firdavsbek Musabekov swam a dead heat in the final and were both awarded a gold medal, resulting in no silver medal being given that for event. In both the Women's 50m Freestyle S11, two bronze medals were awarded each as two swimmers set the same time in third place. No bronze medal was awarded in the 4 × 400 Relay as only two teams completed the event. Therefore, the total number of bronze medals is greater than the total number of gold or silver medals.

* Host nation (Brazil)

2016 Summer Paralympics medal table
Rank	NPC	Gold	Silver	Bronze	Total
1	China	107	81	51	239
2	Great Britain	64	39	44	147
3	Ukraine	41	37	39	117
4	United States	40	44	31	115
5	Australia	22	30	29	81
6	Germany	18	25	14	57
7	Netherlands	17	19	26	62
8	Brazil*	14	29	29	72
9	Italy	10	14	15	39
10	Poland	9	18	12	39
11	Spain	9	14	8	31
12	France	9	5	14	28
13	New Zealand	9	5	7	21
14	Canada	8	10	11	29
15	Iran	8	9	7	24
16	Uzbekistan	8	6	17	31
17	Nigeria	8	2	2	12
18	Cuba	8	1	6	15
19	Belarus	8	0	2	10
20	South Korea	7	11	17	35
21	Tunisia	7	6	6	19
22	South Africa	7	6	4	17
23	Thailand	6	6	6	18
24	Greece	5	4	4	13
25	Belgium	5	3	3	11
25	Slovakia	5	3	3	11
27	Algeria	4	5	7	16
28	Ireland	4	4	3	11
29	Mexico	4	2	9	15
30	Egypt	3	5	4	12
31	Serbia	3	2	4	9
32	Norway	3	2	3	8
33	Morocco	3	2	2	7
34	Turkey	3	1	5	9
35	Kenya	3	1	2	6
36	Malaysia	3	0	1	4
37	Colombia	2	5	10	17
38	United Arab Emirates	2	4	1	7
39	Iraq	2	3	0	5
40	Hong Kong	2	2	2	6
41	Croatia	2	2	1	5
41	Switzerland	2	2	1	5
43	India	2	1	1	4
44	Lithuania	2	1	0	3
45	Latvia	2	0	2	4
46	Singapore	2	0	1	3
47	Hungary	1	8	9	18
48	Azerbaijan	1	8	2	11
49	Sweden	1	4	5	10
50	Austria	1	4	4	9
51	Czech Republic	1	2	4	7
51	Denmark	1	2	4	7
53	Namibia	1	2	2	5
54	Argentina	1	1	3	5
55	Vietnam	1	1	2	4
56	Finland	1	1	1	3
56	Trinidad and Tobago	1	1	1	3
58	Kazakhstan	1	1	0	2
58	Slovenia	1	1	0	2
60	Bahrain	1	0	0	1
60	Bulgaria	1	0	0	1
60	Georgia	1	0	0	1
60	Kuwait	1	0	0	1
64	Japan	0	10	14	24
65	Venezuela	0	3	3	6
66	Jordan	0	2	1	3
67	Qatar	0	2	0	2
68	Chinese Taipei	0	1	1	2
69	Bosnia and Herzegovina	0	1	0	1
69	Ethiopia	0	1	0	1
69	Ivory Coast	0	1	0	1
69	Uganda	0	1	0	1
73	Portugal	0	0	4	4
74	Israel	0	0	3	3
75	Mongolia	0	0	2	2
76	Cape Verde	0	0	1	1
76	Indonesia	0	0	1	1
76	Mozambique	0	0	1	1
76	Pakistan	0	0	1	1
76	Philippines	0	0	1	1
76	Romania	0	0	1	1
76	Saudi Arabia	0	0	1	1
76	Sri Lanka	0	0	1	1
Totals (83 entries)		529	529	539	1,597

== See also ==
- 2016 Summer Olympics medal table
