= Darlenys de la Cruz Severino =

Dominican Paralympic athlete (born 2001)

Personal information
- Full name: Darlenys de la Cruz Severino
- Nationality: Dominican Republic
- Born: 2 May 2001 (age 25) Santo Domingo, Dominican Republic

Sport
- Country: Dominican Republic
- Sport: Athletics
- Disability class: T12
- Event(s): 100 metres, 200 metres
Medal record
Women's para athletics
Representing Dominican Republic
World Championships
Gold medal – first place	2024 Kobe	100 m T12
Silver medal – second place	2024 Kobe	200 m T12

Darlenys de la Cruz Severino (born 2 May 2001) is a Dominican para-athlete who competes in international elite track and field competitions in T12 sprinting events. She competed at 2020 and 2024 Summer Paralympics. She has also medalled at the World Para Athletics Championships.

== Career ==
De la Cruz competed at the 2020 Summer Paralympics (held in 2021). She competed in the 100 metres, where she finished in fourth place. She also competed in the 200 metres, where she was eliminated in Heat 2.

In May 2024, de la Cruz competed at the 2024 World Para Athletics Championships in Kobe, Japan. She won the silver medal in the 200 metres and the gold medal in the 100 metres.

De la Cruz competed at the 2024 Summer Paralympics, where she was the female flagbearer for her country and competed in two events.
