= 2024 World Para Athletics Championships – Women's 200 metres =

The women's 200 metres at the 2024 World Para Athletics Championships were held in Kobe.

== Medalists ==
Event	Gold	Silver	Bronze
T11	Liu Cuiqing; China	Thalita Simplício; Brazil	Jerusa Geber dos Santos; Brazil
T12	Simran Sharma; India	Darlenys de la Cruz Severino; Dominican Republic	Lorraine Gomes de Aguiar; Brazil
T13	Rayane Soares da Silva; Brazil	Erin Kerkhoff; United States	Mana Sasaki; Japan
T35	Zhou Xia; China	Guo Tianqian; China	Preethi Pal; India
T36	Danielle Aitchison; New Zealand	Shi Yiting; China	Mali Lovell; Australia
T37	Wen Xiaoyan; China	Taylor Swanson; United States	Jiang Fenfen; China
T38	Karen Palomeque; Colombia	Darian Faisury Jiménez; Colombia	not awarded
T47	Lisbeli Vera Andrade; Venezuela	Brittni Mason; United States	Saška Sokolov; Serbia
T64	Marlene van Gansewinkel; Netherlands	Sydney Barta; United States	Beatriz Hatz; United States

== T13 ==
The event final took place on 20 May.

Rank	Lane	Name	Nationality	Time	Notes
1st place, gold medalist(s)	7	Rayane Soares da Silva	Brazil	24.89	PB
2nd place, silver medalist(s)	8	Erin Kerkhoff	United States	25.58	PB
3rd place, bronze medalist(s)	6	Mana Sasaki	Japan	26.87	SB
4	5	Melissa Calvo	Costa Rica	28.59	
