= Athletics at the 2024 Summer Paralympics – Women's 400 metres T13 =

Women's 400 metres T13 at the XVII Paralympic Games
- Venue: Stade de France
- Dates: 5 September 2024 (round 1); 7 September 2024 (final)
- Competitors: 13 from 12 nations
- Winning time: 53.55 WR

Medalists
| 1st place, gold medalist(s) | | Rayane Soares da Silva | Brazil |
| 2nd place, silver medalist(s) | | Lamiya Valiyeva | Azerbaijan |
| 3rd place, bronze medalist(s) | | Carolina Duarte | Portugal |

400 metres at the 2024 Summer Paralympics
Men · T11 · T12 · T13 · T20 · T36 · T37 · T38 · T47 · T52 · T53 · T54 · T62
Women · T11 · T12 · T13 · T20 · T37 · T38 · T47 · T53 · T54 ·

The women's 400 metres T13 event at the 2024 Summer Paralympics in Paris, took place on 5 and 7 September 2024.

The T13 category is for athletes with a moderate visual impairment. Athletes in this category have a variety of visual impairments, but can typically recognize contours from a distance of 2 to 6 metres. Athletes in this category do not typically require a guide.

== Records ==
Prior to the competition, the existing records were as follows:

| World Record | Marla Runyan (USA) | 54.46 | (United States) Los Angeles | 3 January 1995 |
| Paralympic Record | Lamiya Valiyeva (AZE) | 55.00 | (Japan) Tokyo | 4 September 2021 |

| Area | Time | | Athlete | Location | Date |
|---|---|---|---|---|---|
| Africa | 55.50 | | (Mozambique) Edmilsa Governo | (Japan) Tokyo | 2 September 2021 |
| America | 54.46 | WR | (United States) Marla Runyan | (United States) Los Angeles | 3 January 1995 |
| Asia | 57.72 | | (Japan) Mana Sasaki | (Japan) Fukuroi | 3 May 2022 |
| Europe | 54.72 | | (Portugal) Carolina Duarte | (Portugal) Lisbon | 18 May 2024 |
| Oceania | 1:05.00 | | (Australia) Lara Hollow-Williams | (Australia) Brisbane | 14 November 2003 |

== Results ==
=== Round 1 ===
First 3 in each heat (Q) and the next 2 fastest (q) advance to the Final.

==== Heat 1 ====
| Rank | Lane | Athlete | Nation | Time | Notes |
|---|---|---|---|---|---|
| 1 | 5 | Carolina Duarte | Portugal | 55.99 | Q |
| 2 | 7 | Erin Kerkhoff | United States | 57.42 | Q |
| 3 | 8 | Nantenin Keita | France | 57.67 | Q |
| 4 | 6 | Adiaratou Iglesias Forneiro | Spain | 58.07 | q, SB |
| 5 | 9 | Mariia Ulianenko | Neutral Paralympic Athletes | 58.57 | q, SB |
| 6 | 4 | Keegan Gaunt | Canada | 1:03.16 | |
| — | 3 | Edmilsa Governo | Mozambique | DNS | |

==== Heat 2 ====
| Rank | Lane | Athlete | Nation | Time | Notes |
|---|---|---|---|---|---|
| 1 | 6 | Rayane Soares da Silva | Brazil | 56.44 | Q |
| 2 | 8 | Lamiya Valiyeva | Azerbaijan | 56.51 | Q |
| 3 | 7 | Mana Sasaki | Japan | 58.77 | Q |
| 4 | 5 | Kym Crosby | United States | 59.04 | |
| 5 | 3 | Gloria Majaga | Botswana | 59.72 | PB |
| 6 | 9 | Peace Oroma | Uganda | 1:01.68 | |
| 7 | 4 | Monica Munga | Zambia | 1:04.90 | PB |

=== Final ===
| Rank | Lane | Athlete | Nation | Time | Notes |
|---|---|---|---|---|---|
| 1st place, gold medalist(s) | 8 | Rayane Soares da Silva | Brazil | 53.55 | WR |
| 2nd place, silver medalist(s) | 5 | Lamiya Valiyeva | Azerbaijan | 55.09 | |
| 3rd place, bronze medalist(s) | 6 | Carolina Duarte | Portugal | 55.52 | |
| 4 | 3 | Adiaratou Iglesias Forneiro | Spain | 56.98 | SB |
| 5 | 7 | Erin Kerkhoff | United States | 57.19 | |
| 6 | 9 | Nantenin Keita | France | 57.43 | |
| 7 | 4 | Mana Sasaki | Japan | 58.35 | SB |
| 8 | 2 | Mariia Ulianenko | Neutral Paralympic Athletes | 58.96 | |
