= Mozambique at the 2012 Summer Paralympics =

- IPC code: MOZ
- NPC: Paralympic Committee Mozambique

in London
- Competitors: 2 in 1 sport
- Medals: Gold 0 Silver 0 Bronze 0 Total 0

Summer Paralympics appearances (overview)
- 2012; 2016; 2020; 2024

Mozambique made its Paralympic Games début at the 2012 Summer Paralympics in London, United Kingdom from August 29 to September 9, 2012.

== Athletics ==
Athlete	Event	Heat		Semifinal		Final	
Athlete	Event	Result	Rank	Result	Rank	Result	Rank
Pita Bulande	Men's 200m T11	26.68	4	Did not advance			
Pita Bulande	Men's 400m T11	57.51	4	—N/a		Did not advance	
Maria Muchavo	Women's 100m T12	13.97	4	Did not advance			
Maria Muchavo	Women's 200m T12	28.28	4	—N/a		Did not advance	
Maria Muchavo	Women's 400m T12	1:03.68	3	Did not advance			

== See also ==
- Mozambique at the Paralympics
- Mozambique at the 2012 Summer Olympics
