= Mozambique at the 2016 Summer Paralympics =

- IPC code: MOZ
- NPC: Paralympic Committee Mozambique

in Rio de Janeiro
- Competitors: 1 in 1 sports
- Flag bearer: Edmilsa Governo
- Medals Ranked 76th: Gold 0 Silver 0 Bronze 1 Total 1

Summer Paralympics appearances (overview)
- 2012; 2016; 2020; 2024

Mozambique sent a delegation to compete at the 2016 Summer Paralympics in Rio de Janeiro, Brazil, from 7 to 18 September 2016. This was the country's second time competing at a Summer Paralympic Games after making its debut at the 2012 Summer Paralympics. Mozambique was represented by one athlete, Edmilisa Governo, a short-distance sprinter. She competed in two events, the women's 100 metres T12 competition and the women's 400 metres T12. Governo reached the semi-finals of the women's 100 metres T12 and took Mozambique's first Paralympic Games medal in the women's 400 metres T12 by placing third in the final of the competition.

== Background ==
Mozambique made its second Paralympic Games appearance in Rio de Janeiro, with their Paralympic debut occurring four years prior at the 2012 Summer Paralympics in London. In contrast, Mozambique has been competing at the Olympic Games since the 1980 Summer Olympics. The 2016 Summer Paralympics were held from 7–18 September 2016 with a total of 4,328 athletes representing 159 National Paralympic Committees taking part. Mozambique sent one athlete to the Rio Paralympics, in athletics, Edmilsa Governo, a short-distance sprinter. She travelled with her coach Narciso Faquir to Rio de Janeiro on 1 September. Governo was chosen as the flag bearer during the parade of nations for the opening ceremony.

== Disability classifications ==
Every participant at the Paralympics has their disability grouped into one of five disability categories; amputation, the condition may be congenital or sustained through injury or illness; cerebral palsy; wheelchair athletes, there is often overlap between this and other categories; visual impairment, including blindness; Les autres, any physical disability that does not fall strictly under one of the other categories, for example dwarfism or multiple sclerosis. Each Paralympic sport then has its own classifications, dependent upon the specific physical demands of competition. Events are given a code, made of numbers and letters, describing the type of event and classification of the athletes competing. Some sports, such as athletics, divide athletes by both the category and severity of their disabilities, other sports, for example swimming, group competitors from different categories together, the only separation being based on the severity of the disability.

== Medallists ==
Mozambique finished tied for twelfth among African countries for total gold medals and seventy-sixth overall, winning one bronze. Cape Verde also won a single bronze medal.

Medal	Name	Sport	Event	Date
Bronze	Edmilsa Governo (Guide – Filipe Chaimite)	Athletics	Women's 400 m T12	17 September

== Athletics ==
Edmlisa Governo was 18 years old at the time of the Rio Summer Paralympics and she was making her Paralympic debut. Her disability is congenital; she was born with a visual impairment that has rendered her unable to see farther than 50 m (160 ft). Governo is classified by the International Paralympic Committee as T12. She earned automatic qualification to the Games through her performance at the Tunisian International Meeting in March 2016, where she won two gold medals. This made Governo the first athlete from Mozambique to qualify for the Paralympics through standard qualifying procedures. She received sponsorship to make the Games, and immediately began training after her qualification was guaranteed. She told Radio France Internationale in June 2016 about her participation in Rio de Janeiro, "I'm going to win. I'll stop there, call my name and dictate the mark (Laughter). I can already imagine myself on track 2 or on track 7, what will it be like if I am on track 7, if I am on track 4, on track 3. I begin to imagine when I reach the finish line. I can already imagine it on the podium. I even dream of the Games."

On 7 September, Governo competed in the women's 100 metres T12 competition with her guide Filipe Chaimite. Assigned to heat three, she finished third and last of all athletes with a new African record time of 12.65 seconds. Despite this result, Governo's time was fast enough to advance her to the semi-finals. She was placed in the second heat at that stage, finishing third out of four sprinters, with an improved time of 12.35 seconds. Governo was fifth out of eight finishers overall and did not progress to the final since only the top four athletes were permitted to advance. (Note: One athlete, Oxana Boturchuk, was disqualified, and another, Rose Welepa, did not start.) She participated with Chaimite in the heats of the women's 400 metres T12 on 15 September. Governo finished second out of four athletes in heat three and her time of 54.94 seconds was fast enough to advance her to the final. In the final on 17 September, she finished third out of four sprinters with a time of 53.89 seconds, earning her a bronze medal and Mozambique's first medal at the Paralympic Games. (Note: One sprinter, Yaqin Shen, was disqualified.)

Women's Track

Athlete	Events	Heat		Semifinal		Final	
Athlete	Events	Time	Rank	Time	Rank	Time	Rank
Edmilsa Governo (Guide – Filipe Chaimite)	100 m T12	12.65	3 Q	12.35	3	did not advance	
Edmilsa Governo (Guide – Filipe Chaimite)	400 m T12	54.94	2 Q	—N/a		53.89	(bronze)

== See also ==
- Mozambique at the 2016 Summer Olympics
