= 2011 IPC Athletics World Championships – Women's 400 metres =

The women's 400 metres at the 2011 IPC Athletics World Championships is held at the QEII Stadium from 22–29 January

== Medalists ==
Class	Gold	Silver	Bronze
T11	Terezinha Guilhermina; Brazil	Tracey Hinton; Great Britain	Adria Rocha Santos; Brazil
T12	Assia El Hannouni; France	Oxana Boturchuk; Ukraine	Xu Jiping; China
T13	Omara Durand; Cuba	Somaya Bousaid; Tunisia	Sanaa Benhama; Morocco
T37	Bethany Woodward; Great Britain	Maryna Snisar; Ukraine	Anastasiya Ovsyannikova; Russia
T46	Yunidis Castillo; Cuba	Anrune Liebenberg; South Africa	Alicja Fiodorow; Poland
T52	Michelle Stilwell; Canada	Kerry Morgan; United States	Teruyo Tanaka; Japan
T53	Huang Lisha; China	Anjali Forber Pratt; United States	Amanda McGrory; United States
T54	Tatyana McFadden; United States	Diane Roy; Canada	Manuela Schaer; Switzerland
