= Liang Yanfen =

Chinese Paralympic athlete (born 2000)

Personal information
- Born: 26 September 2000 (age 25) Xiqiao Town, Nanhai District, Foshan, Guangdong

Sport
- Country: China
- Sport: Para-athletics
Medal record
Women's para-athletics
Representing China
Paralympic Games
| Bronze medal – third place | 2020 Tokyo | 100 m T12 |
World Championships
| Silver medal – second place | 2025 New Delhi | 100 m T12 |
Asian Para Games
| Gold medal – first place | 2022 Hangzhou | 100 m T13 |

Liang Yanfen (Chinese: 梁 燕芬; born 26 September 2000) is a Chinese Paralympic athlete.

== Career ==
She won the bronze medal in the women's 100 metres T12 event at the 2020 Summer Paralympics held in Tokyo, Japan. She also competed in the women's 200 metres T12 event.
