= Mozambique at the 2020 Summer Paralympics =

- IPC code: MOZ
- NPC: Paralympic Committee Mozambique

in Tokyo
- Competitors: 2 in 1 sport
- Medals: Gold 0 Silver 0 Bronze 0 Total 0

Summer appearances
- 2012 • 2016 • 2020 • 2024

Mozambique competed at the 2020 Summer Paralympics in Tokyo, Japan, from 24 August to 5 September 2021. The countries delegation consisted of two participants both competing in athletics.

== Athletics ==
Track

Athlete	Event	Heats		Final	
Athlete	Event	Result	Rank	Result	Rank
Hilario Chavela	Men's 400 m T13	53.02s	7	did not advance	
Edmilsa Governo	Women's 100 m T13	12.71s	6	did not advance	
Edmilsa Governo	Women's 400 m T13	55.50s	1	57.68s	5

Field

Athlete	Event	Final	
Athlete	Event	Result	Rank
Hilario Chavela	Men's long jump T13	5.18 m	7

== See also ==
- Mozambique at the 2020 Summer Olympics
