= Lamiya Valiyeva =

Azerbaijani Paralympic athlete (born 2002)

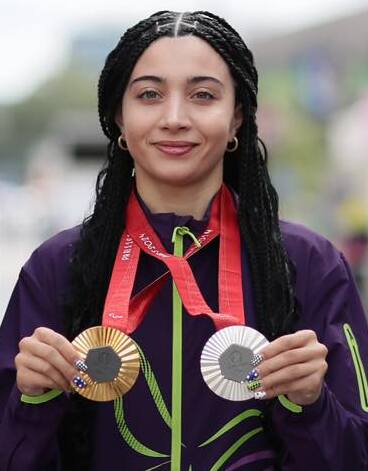
- Valiyeva at the 2024 Summer Paralympics

Personal information
- Nationality: Azerbaijani
- Born: 5 April 2002 (age 24)

Sport
- Sport: Paralympic athletics
- Disability class: T13
- Event: Sprints
Medal record
Women's para-athletics
Representing Azerbaijan
Paralympic Games
Gold medal – first place	2020 Tokyo	400 m T13
Gold medal – first place	2024 Paris	100 m T13
Silver medal – second place	2020 Tokyo	100 m T13
Silver medal – second place	2024 Paris	400 m T13
World Championships
Gold medal – first place	2023 Paris	100 m T13
Gold medal – first place	2023 Paris	400 m T13
Gold medal – first place	2024 Kobe	100 m T13
Gold medal – first place	2024 Kobe	400 m T13
European Championships
Bronze medal – third place	2019 Bydgoszcz	4×100 m

Lamiya Valiyeva (born 5 April 2002) is an Azerbaijani Paralympic athlete who specializes in sprints. She represented Azerbaijan at the 2020 and 2024 Summer Paralympics.

== Career ==
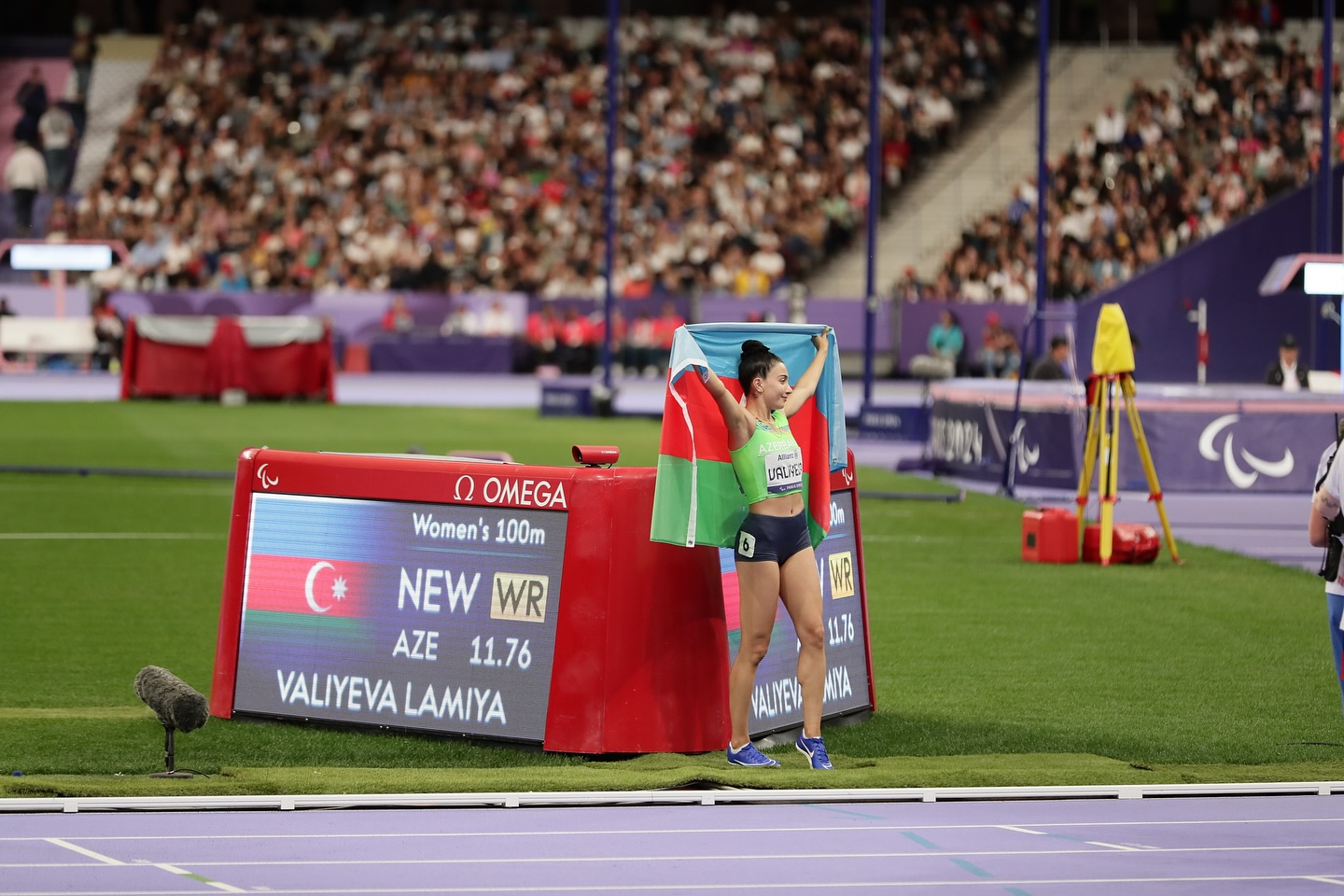
Valiyeva at the 2024 Summer Paralympics with her world record time

Valiyeva represented Azerbaijan at the 2020 Summer Paralympics and won a gold medal in the 400 metres T13 event in world record time and a silver medal in the 100 metres T13 event.

She competed at the 2023 World Para Athletics Championships and won gold medals in the 100 metres and 400 metres T13 events. She again competed at the 2024 World Para Athletics Championships and won gold medals in the 100 metres and 400 metres T13 events.

She represented Azerbaijan at the 2024 Summer Paralympics and won a gold medal in the 100 metres T13 event. She also set a new world record by running 100 meters in 11.76 seconds, surpassing Leilia Adzhametova's previous best result of 11.79 seconds achieved at the Rio 2016 Paralympics. She also won a silver medal in the 400 metres T13 with a time of 55.09 seconds.

She was awarded the Shohrat Order by the President of the Azerbaijan, Ilham Aliyev, on 10 September 2024, for her outstanding achievements at the 2024 Summer Paralympics and her contributions to the development of Azerbaijani sports. The president's decree, dated the same day, also awarded her a cash prize of 200,000 manat for winning gold and 100,000 manat for winning silver at the Paralympic Games.

She took a silver in the 2025 European Athletics Team Championships in Third Division.

In May 2026, at the European Athletics Small Countries Championships in Monaco, Lamia Veliyeva took 2nd place in the 100 meters with a result of 11.91 seconds.
