= Alice Côrrea =

Brazilian Paralympic athlete

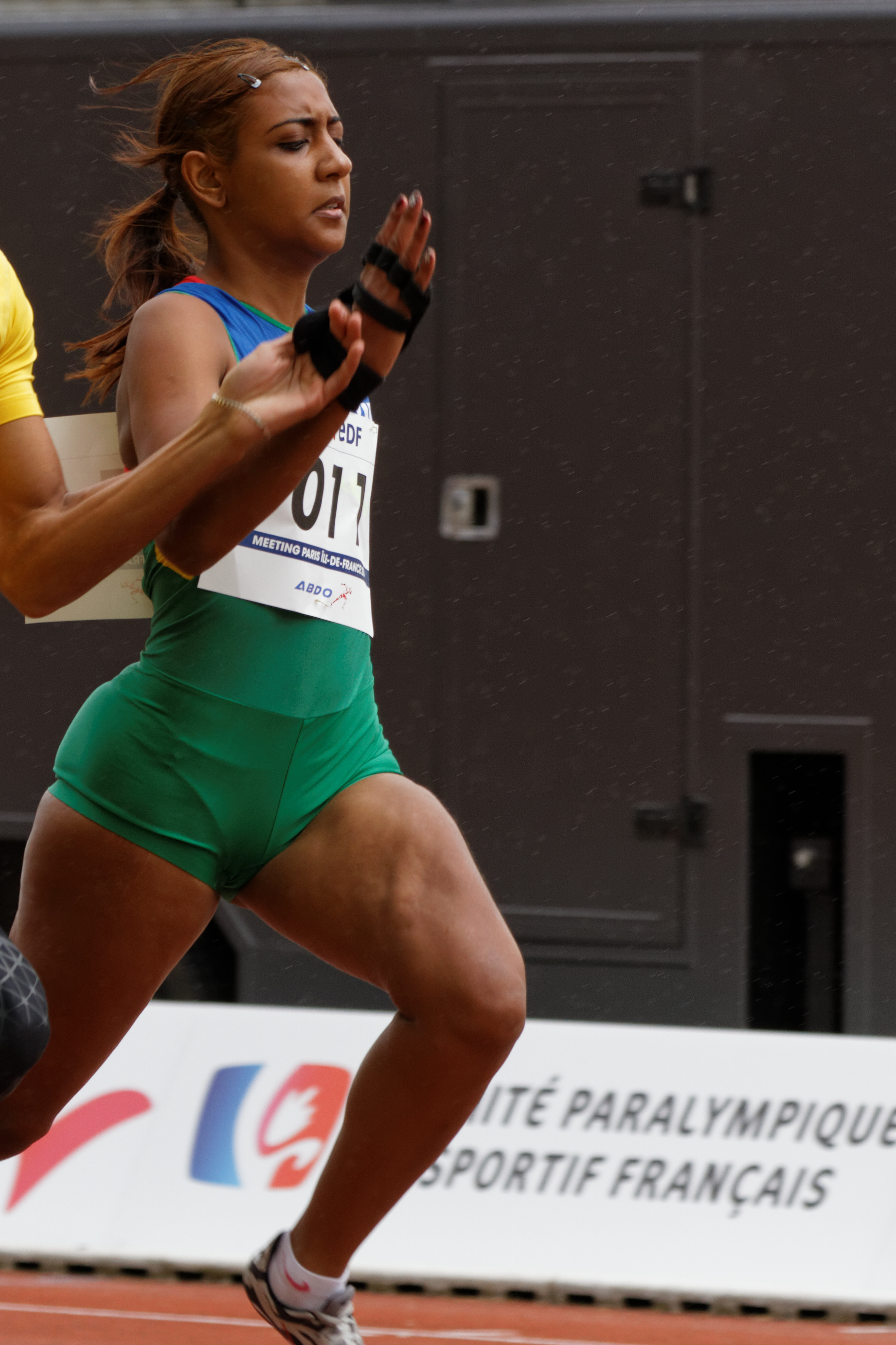

Personal information
- Full name: Alice de Oliveira Côrrea
- Born: 2 March 1996 (age 30) Rio de Janeiro, Brazil
- Home town: Jacarepaguá, Brazil
- Height: 1.62 m (5 ft 4 in)
- Weight: 57 kg (126 lb)

Sport
- Country: Brazil
- Sport: Paralympic athletics
- Disability: Glaucoma and cataracts
- Disability class: T12
Medal record
Paralympic athletics
Representing Brazil
Paralympic Games
Silver medal – second place	2016 Rio de Janeiro	4x100m relay T11-13
Parapan American Games
Silver medal – second place	2023 Santiago	Long jump T11/12

Alice de Oliveira Côrrea (born 2 March 1996) is a Brazilian Paralympic athlete who competes in sprinting events at international elite competitions. She is a Paralympic silver medalist at the 2016 Summer Paralympics.
