= Katrin Müller-Rottgardt =

German Paralympic athlete (born 1982)

Katrin Mueller-Rottgardt
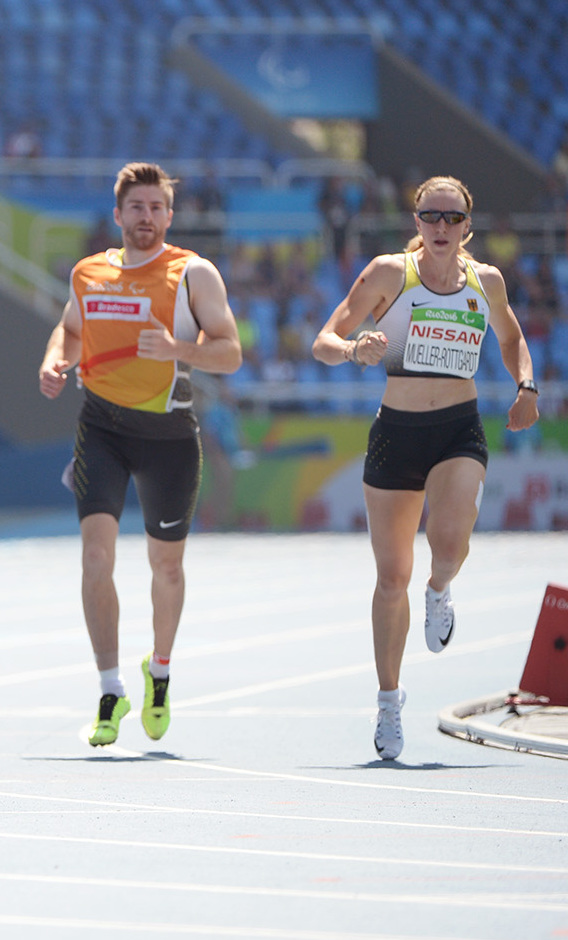

Personal information
- Born: 15 January 1982 (age 44)

Sport
- Country: Germany
Medal record
Women's para-athletics
Representing Germany
Paralympic Games
Bronze medal – third place	2024 Paris	100 m T12

Katrin Mueller-Rottgardt (born 15 January 1982) is a German para-track and field athlete. She is a T12/F12 classification athlete meaning that she has limited vision and she runs with the aid of a sighted guide. She competed at the 2016 Summer Paralympics in the 100 metres, 200 metres and long jump. She won a bronze medal in the 100 metres with a personal best of 11.99 seconds. She runs with Noel Philippe Fiener.

World champion in 2003 over 200 metres and 400 metres, Mueller-Rottgardt won 2016 Paralympics bronze in the 100 metres, and claimed back-to-back 100 metres European titles in 2016 in Grosseto and 2018 in Berlin.

== See also ==
- Germany at the 2016 Summer Paralympics
