= Maria Muchavo =

Mozambican athlete (born 1992)

Maria Elisa Muchavo
Personal information
- Nationality: Mozambique
- Born: 26 July 1992 (age 33)

Sport
- Sport: Athletics
- Event: Sprint (T12)
Medal record
Women's Athletics
Representing Mozambique
Commonwealth Games
Silver medal – second place	2014 Glasgow	100 m T12
African Games
Silver medal – second place	2015 Brazzaville	200 m T12
Bronze medal – third place	2011 Maputo	200 m T12
- Updated on 26 August 2016

Maria Elisa Muchavo (born 26 July 1992 in Maputo) is a disabled track and field athlete from Mozambique who won a silver medal at the 2014 Commonwealth Games in the T12 100 metres event. She was her country's first woman to compete at the Summer Paralympics, doing so in 2012. She was a 200 metres bronze medallist at the 2011 All-Africa Games.
