= Rayane Soares da Silva =

Brazilian Paralympic athlete

Rayane Soares
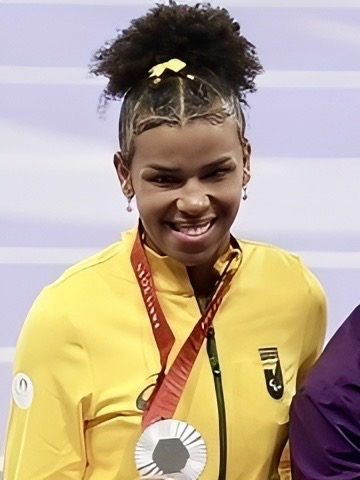
- Soares at the 2024 Summer Paralympics

Personal information
- Full name: Rayane Soares da Silva
- Born: 20 January 1997 (age 29) Caxias, Maranhão, Brazil

Sport
- Sport: Paralympic athletics
- Disability: Bilateral microphthalmia
- Disability class: T13
- Event(s): 100 metres 200 metres 400 metres
Medal record
Representing Brazil
Paralympic Games
Gold medal – first place	2024 Paris	400 m T13
Silver medal – second place	2024 Paris	100 m T13
World Championships
Gold medal – first place	2019 Dubai	400m T13
Gold medal – first place	2024 Kobe	200m T13
Silver medal – second place	2019 Dubai	200m T13
Silver medal – second place	2024 Kobe	100m T13
Silver medal – second place	2025 New Delhi	100m T13
Silver medal – second place	2025 New Delhi	200m T13
Bronze medal – third place	2023 Paris	400m T13
Bronze medal – third place	2024 Kobe	400m T13
Parapan American Games
Gold medal – first place	2023 Santiago	100m T13
Gold medal – first place	2023 Santiago	400m T13
Silver medal – second place	2019 Lima	100m T13

Rayane Soares da Silva (born 20 January 1997) is a Brazilian Paralympic athlete who competes in sprinting events at international track and field competitions. She is a double World champion and double Parapan American Games champion.

== Career ==
She represented Brazil at the 2020 Summer Paralympics but did not medal. She again represented Brazil at the 2024 Summer Paralympics and won a gold medal in the 400 metre T13 event, and a silver medal in the 100 metres T13 event.
