= Mana Sasaki =

Japanese para athlete (born 1997)

Personal information
- Native name: 佐々木真菜
- Nationality: Japanese
- Born: 2 September 1997 (age 29) Fukushima, Japan

Sport
- Sport: Para-athletics
- Disability class: T13
- Event: sprints
Medal record
Women's para-athletics
Representing Japan
World Championships
Bronze medal – third place	2024 Kobe	200 m T13
Bronze medal – third place	2025 New Delhi	400 m T13
Asian Para Games
Gold medal – first place	2018 Jakarta	400 m T13
Silver medal – second place	2022 Hangzhou	400 m T13
Bronze medal – third place	2026 Aichi–Nagoya	1500 m T13

Mana Sasaki (佐々木真菜, Sasaki Mana; born 2 September 1997) is a visually impaired Japanese para athlete who competes in T13 sprint events. She represented Japan at the 2020 and 2024 Summer Paralympics.

== Career ==
Sasaki competed at the 2018 Asian Para Games and won a gold medal in the 400 metres T13 event and with an Asian Para Games record time of 1:01.48. She competed at the 2019 World Para Athletics Championships and finished in fourth place in the 400 metres T13 event with a time of 58.38 seconds. As a result she qualified for the 2020 Summer Paralympics. During the 2020 Summer Paralympics she finished in seventh place in the 400 metres T13 event with an area record time of 58.05 seconds.

She again represented Japan at the 2024 Summer Paralympics and finished in seventh place in the 400 metres T13 event with a season best time of 58.35 seconds. She competed at the 2025 World Para Athletics Championships and won a bronze medal in the 400 metres T13 event with a time of 59.39 seconds.
