= Adiaratou Iglesias Forneiro =

Spanish Paralympic athlete

Adiaratou Iglesias
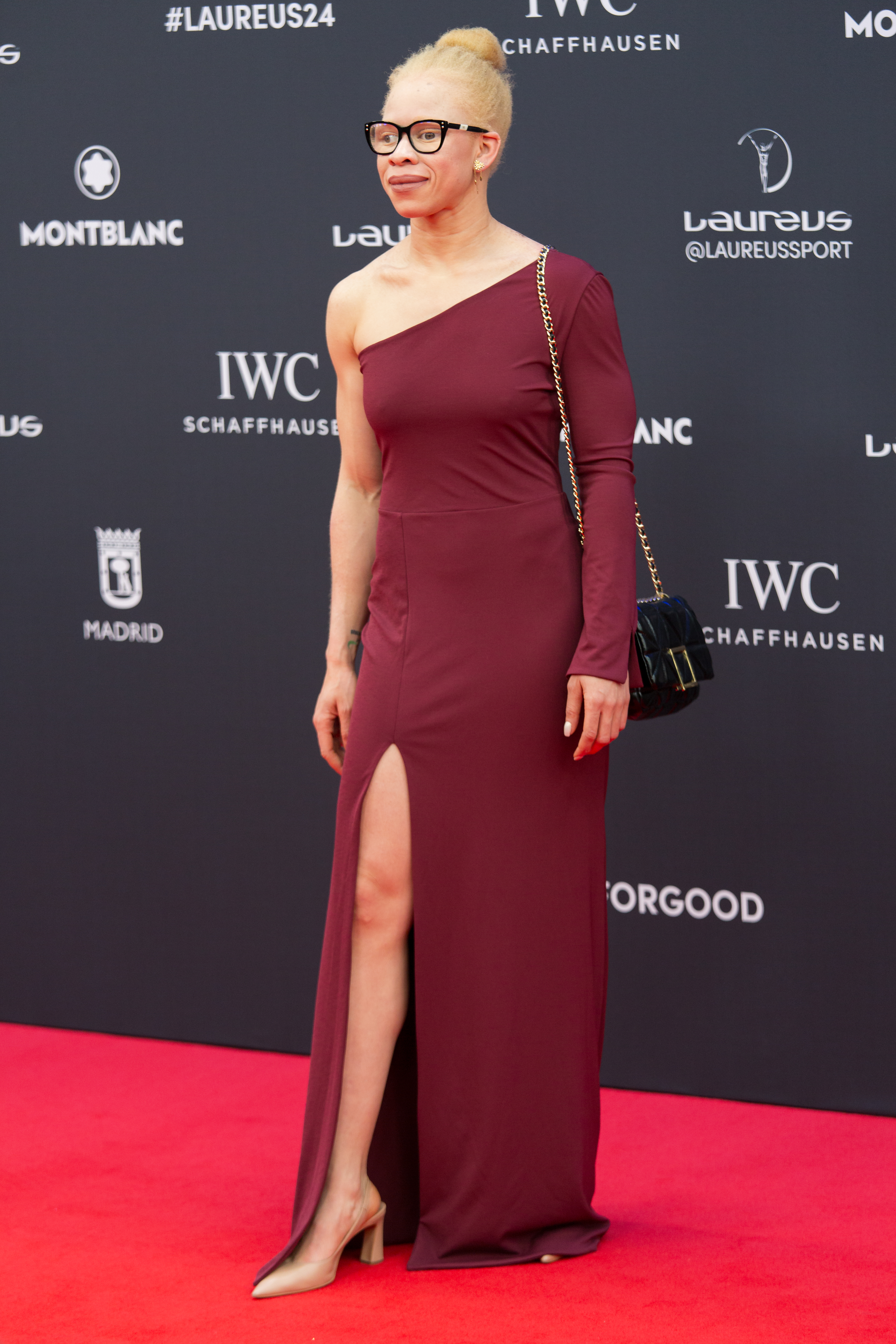
- Iglesias in 2024

Personal information
- Full name: Adiaratou Iglesias Forneiro
- Nationality: Spanish
- Born: Adiaratou Camará; 6 February 1999 (age 27) Bamako, Mali

Sport
- Sport: Paralympic athletics
- Disability class: T13
- Event: Sprint
Medal record
Women's para athletics
Representing Spain
Event	1st	2nd	3rd
Paralympic Games	1	2	0
World Championships	0	3	0
European Championships	2	0	0
Total	3	5	0
Paralympic Games
Gold medal – first place	2020 Tokyo	100 m – T13
Silver medal – second place	2020 Tokyo	400 m - T13
World Championships
Silver medal – second place	2019 Dubai	100 m – T12
Silver medal – second place	2019 Dubai	200 m – T12
Silver medal – second place	2023 Paris	100 m – T13
European Championships
Gold medal – first place	2021 Bydgoszcz	100 m – T13
Gold medal – first place	2021 Bydgoszcz	100 m – T13

Adiaratou "Adi" Iglesias Forneiro (née Camará; born 6 February 1999) is a Spanish track and field athlete.

== Early life ==
Iglesias was born in Bamako, Mali in 1999. In 2010, she left Mali primarily due to the country's superstition surrounding albinism, and moved to Logroño, Spain where her brother and sister-in-law were living. As a result of alleged abuse in the home, Adiaratou was placed in foster care where she remained for 2 years. She has since been adopted and currently resides in Lugo, Spain with her foster family.

== Career ==
In June 2019, during the Athletics Grand Prix in Grosseto, she broke a national record for Spain in the T12 category of 100m at 12.42 seconds (despite an opposing wind factor of -1.8); she also won the 200m with 25.78 seconds. These times qualified her for the World Para Athletics Championships held in Dubai where she earned the silver medal and set another record for Spain in the 100m T12 clocking 11.99.

Due to albinism, Iglesias has 10% eyesight which increases to around 20% with glasses. While she uses reference points on the track to help guide her, she also employs the assistance of a guide during races.

At the 2020 Summer Paralympics, Iglesias won a gold medal in the women's 100m T13 and a silver medal in the women's 400m T13.
