= Melani Bergés Gámez =

Spanish Paralympic athlete

Personal information
- Born: 28 May 1990 (age 36) Badalona, Spain

Sport
- Country: Spain
- Sport: Paralympic athletics
- Disability class: T12
- Event(s): 100 metres 200 metres 400 metres 4 × 100 metre relay
- Club: AD Marathon, Madrid
- Coached by: Alexis Sánchez
Medal record
Paralympic athletics
Representing Spain
World Championships
Silver medal – second place	2017 London	Women's 400 m T12
Bronze medal – third place	2015 Doha	Women's 4 × 100 m relay T11-13
European Championships
Gold medal – first place	2016 Grosseto	Women's 400 m T12
Silver medal – second place	2018 Berlin	Women's 100 m T12
Silver medal – second place	2018 Berlin	Women's 400 m T12

Melani Bergés Gámez (born 6 May 1990) is a blind Spanish Paralympic athlete who competes in sprinting events in international level events.
