= Alejandra Paola Pérez López =

Venezuelan Paralympic athlete (born 1998)

Alejandra Pérez
- Alejandra Paola Pérez Lopez and her guide at the 2024 Summer Paralympics.

Personal information
- Full name: Alejandra Paola Pérez López
- Born: 9 July 1998 (age 28) Maracaibo, Zulia, Venezuela

Sport
- Country: Venezuela
- Sport: Paralympic athletics
- Disability class: T12
- Events: 100 metres 200 metres 400 metres
Medal record
Women's para-athletics
Representing Venezuela
Paralympic Games
Silver medal – second place	2024 Paris	200 m T12
Bronze medal – third place	2020 Tokyo	400m T12
World Championships
Silver medal – second place	2023 Paris	100m T12
Silver medal – second place	2023 Paris	200m T12
Bronze medal – third place	2025 New Delhi	400m T12
Parapan American Games
Silver medal – second place	2023 Santiago	200m T12

Alejandra Paola Pérez López (born 9 July 1998) is a Venezuelan Paralympic athlete who competes in sprinting events at international elite events.

== Career ==
Perez competed at the 2020 Summer Paralympics, winning the bronze medal at the women's 400m event. She is the twin sister of Linda Patricia Pérez López who is also an athlete.
