= Cuba at the 2016 Summer Paralympics =

- IPC code: CUB
- NPC: Comité Paralimpico Cubano

in Rio de Janeiro
- Competitors: 22 in 8 sports
- Medals Ranked 18th: Gold 8 Silver 1 Bronze 6 Total 15

Summer Paralympics appearances (overview)
- 1992; 1996; 2000; 2004; 2008; 2012; 2016; 2020; 2024

Cuba competed at the 2016 Summer Paralympics in Rio de Janeiro, Brazil, from 7 to 18 September 2016.

== Disability classifications ==
Every participant at the Paralympics has their disability grouped into one of five disability categories; amputation, the condition may be congenital or sustained through injury or illness; cerebral palsy; wheelchair athletes, there is often overlap between this and other categories; visual impairment, including blindness; Les autres, any physical disability that does not fall strictly under one of the other categories, for example dwarfism or multiple sclerosis. Each Paralympic sport then has its own classifications, dependent upon the specific physical demands of competition. Events are given a code, made of numbers and letters, describing the type of event and classification of the athletes competing. Some sports, such as athletics, divide athletes by both the category and severity of their disabilities, other sports, for example swimming, group competitors from different categories together, the only separation being based on the severity of the disability.

== Medalists ==
Medal	Name	Sport	Event	Date
Gold	Dalidaivis Rodriguez	Judo	Women's −63kg	September 9
Gold	Omara Durand	Athletics	Women's 100 metres T12	September 9
Gold	Omara Durand	Athletics	Women's 200 metres T12	September 12
Gold	Omara Durand	Athletics	Women's 400 metres T12	September 17
Gold	Ernesto Blanco	Athletics	Men's 400 metres T47	September 17
Gold	Leinier Savon Pineda	Athletics	Men's 100 metres T12	September 15
Gold	Leinier Savon Pineda	Athletics	Men's 200 metres T12	September 17
Silver	Yunidis Castillo	Athletics	Women's long jump T47	September 8
Bronze	Leonardo Díaz	Athletics	Men's discus throw F56	September 10
Bronze	Yordani Fernandez Sastre	Judo	Men's −100 kg	September 10
Bronze	Yangaliny Jimenez	Judo	Men's +100 kg	September 10
Bronze	Malu Perez Iser	Athletics	Women's long jump T42	September 10
Bronze	Noraivis de la Heras Chibas	Athletics	Women's discus throw F43/44	September 11

== Cycling ==
With one pathway for qualification being one highest ranked NPCs on the UCI Para-Cycling male and female Nations Ranking Lists on 31 December 2014, Cuba qualified for the 2016 Summer Paralympics in Rio, assuming they continued to meet all other eligibility requirements.

== See also ==
- Cuba at the 2016 Summer Olympics
