= Erin Kerkhoff =

American Paralympic athlete (born 2000)

Personal information
- Born: 13 December 2000 (age 25) Coralville, Iowa, United States

Sport
- Sport: Paralympic athletics
- Disability class: T13
- Club: UNI Panthers
Medal record
Representing United States
World Championships
Silver medal – second place	2024 Kobe	200m T13
Bronze medal – third place	2023 Paris	200m T13

Erin Kerkhoff (born 13 December 2000) is an American Paralympic athlete who competes in international track and field competitions. She is a World silver medalist and has competed at the 2020 and 2024 Summer Paralympics.
