= Oksana Boturchuk =

Ukrainian Paralympic athlete (born 1984)

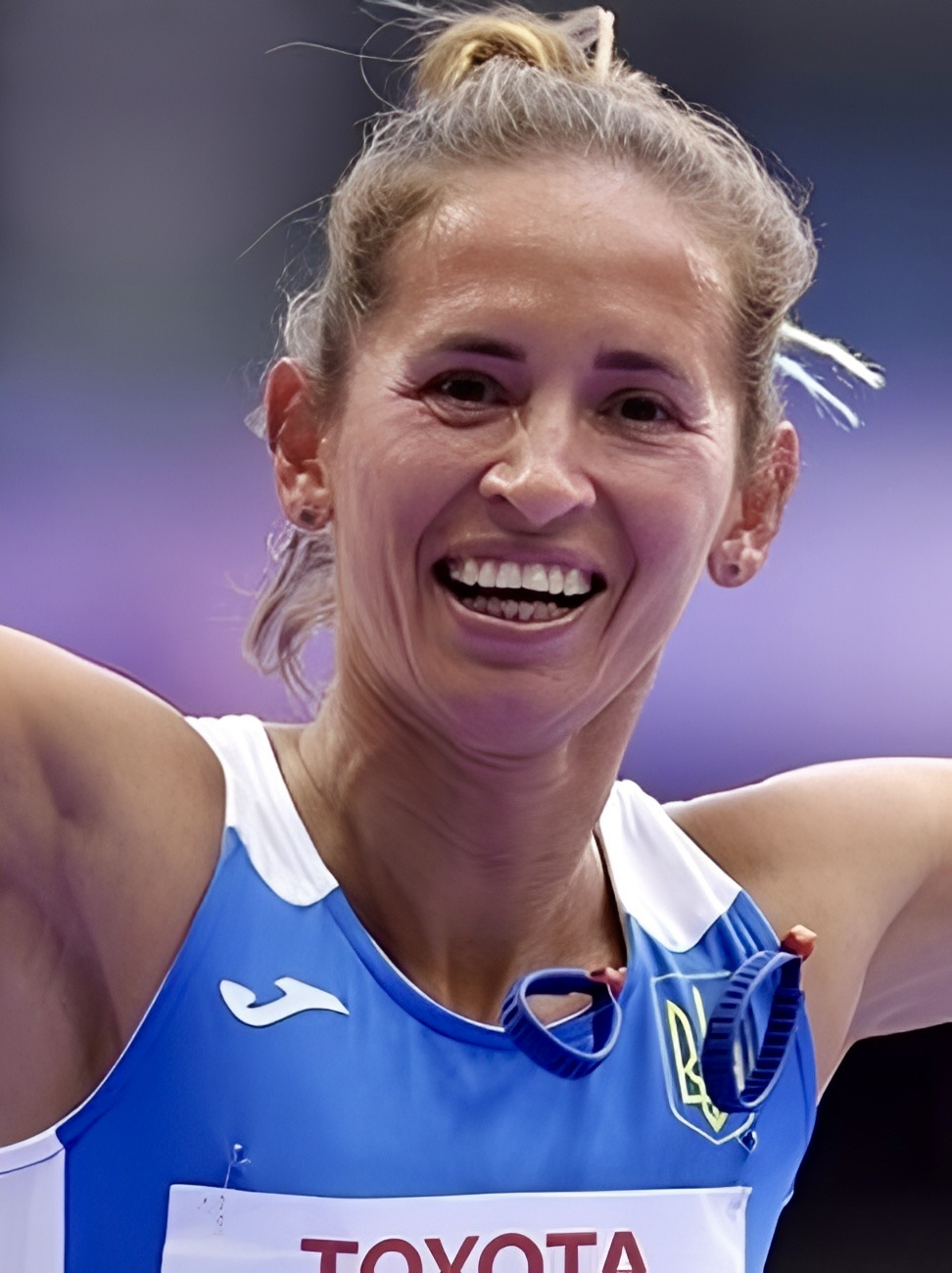
- Boturchuk at the 2024 Summer Paralympics

Personal information
- Full name: Oksana Boturchuk
- Nationality: Ukrainian
- Born: 12 September 1984 (age 42)

Sport
- Sport: Paralympic athletics
- Disability class: T12
- Event: Sprint
- Club: Invasport
- Coached by: Kostyantyn Rurak, Olena Rurak
Medal record
Women's para athletics
Representing Ukraine
Event	1st	2nd	3rd
Paralympic Games	1	9	2
World Championships	1	7	3
IPC European Championships	4	0	0
Total	6	16	5
Paralympic Games
Gold medal – first place	2008 Beijing	100m - T12
Silver medal – second place	2008 Beijing	200m - T12
Silver medal – second place	2008 Beijing	400m - T12
Silver medal – second place	2012 London	400m - T12
Silver medal – second place	2016 Rio de Janeiro	200m - T12
Silver medal – second place	2016 Rio de Janeiro	400m - T12
Silver medal – second place	2020 Tokyo	100 m – T12
Silver medal – second place	2020 Tokyo	200m - T12
Silver medal – second place	2020 Tokyo	400m - T12
Silver medal – second place	2024 Paris	100 m - T12
Bronze medal – third place	2012 London	100m - T12
Bronze medal – third place	2024 Paris	400m - T12
World Championships
Silver medal – second place	2006 Doha	100m - T12
Silver medal – second place	2006 Doha	200m - T12
Silver medal – second place	2011 Christchurch	400m - T12
Silver medal – second place	2011 Christchurch	400m - T12
Silver medal – second place	2013 Lyon	200m - T12
Bronze medal – third place	2013 Lyon	100m - T12
Gold medal – first place	2015 Doha	200m - T12
Silver medal – second place	2015 Doha	400m - T12
Bronze medal – third place	2015 Doha	100m - T12
Silver medal – second place	2019 Dubai	400m - T12
Bronze medal – third place	2019 Dubai	200m - T12
European Championships
Gold medal – first place	2014 Swansea	100m - T12
Gold medal – first place	2014 Swansea	200m - T12
Gold medal – first place	2014 Swansea	400m - T12
Gold medal – first place	2018 Berlin	200m -T12
Gold medal – first place	2018 Berlin	400m - T12

Oksana Boturchuk (Ukrainian: Оксана Ботурчук) (born 12 September 1984) is a Paralympic athlete from Ukraine competing mainly in category T12 sprint events.

== Early life ==
Boturchuk hails from the Dnipropetrovsk region in Ukraine. She was born into a family of athletes, her father was a Master of Sports of the USSR in Sambo, whiles her mother was a candidate for Master of Sports in athletics. She experienced vision loss after an auto accident.

== Career ==
=== Athletic career ===
She competed in the 2008 Summer Paralympics in Beijing, China. There she won a gold medal in the women's 100 metres - T12 event, a silver medal in the women's 200 metres - T12 event, a silver medal in the women's 400 metres - T12 event and finished eighth in the women's Long jump - F12 event.

At the 2020 Summer Olympics in Tokyo, Japan, she won three silver medals.

In August 2021, a movie about her life titled Puls was released.

In September 2024, she won a silver medal in the women's 100m—T12 final in the Paralympic Games in Paris with a time of 12.70s. She and her guide Mykyta Barabanov also won a bronze medal in the 400 meters dash.

=== Education ===
As at 2024, Boturchuk is a lecturer at the Department of Special Physical Training at DSUIA.

== Personal life ==
Boturchuk is married and has three children.

== Awards ==
Boturchuk has state awards which include the Order of Merit (I, II, and III degrees).
