= Greilyz Villarroel =

Venezuelan Paralympic athlete

Personal information
- Born: 24 June 1996 (age 30) Maracaibo, Venezuela

Sport
- Country: Venezuela
- Sport: Paralympic athletics
- Disability: Strabismus, glaucoma, retinitis
- Disability class: T12
- Event(s): 100 metres 200 metres 400 metres
- Coached by: Isidro Barthelemy
Medal record
Paralympic athletics
Representing Venezuela
Parapan American Games
Silver medal – second place	2019 Lima	200m T12
Silver medal – second place	2019 Lima	400m T12
Bronze medal – third place	2015 Toronto	100m T12
Bronze medal – third place	2015 Toronto	200m T12
World Championships
Bronze medal – third place	2019 Dubai	400m T12

Greilyz Greimal Villaroel Hernandez (born 24 June 1996) is a Venezuelan Paralympic athlete who competes in international elite track and field competitions in sprinting events. She is a double Parapan American Games silver medalist and a World bronze medalist.
