= Edmilsa Governo =

Mozambican athlete (born 1998)

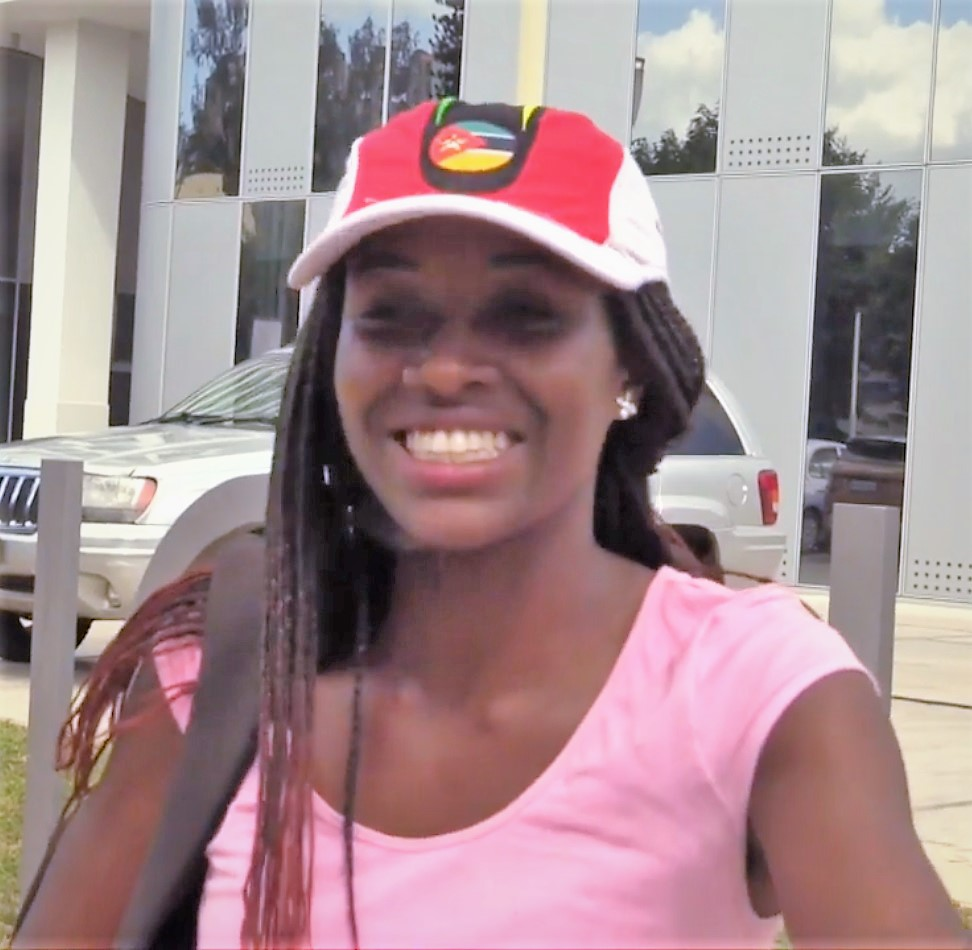
- Governo on TV Surdo Mozambique in 2017

Personal information
- Born: 28 February 1998 (age 28) Maputo, Mozambique

Sport
- Sport: Athletics
- Disability class: T12, T13

Achievements and titles
- Paralympic finals: 2016, 2020
Medal record
Para-athletics
Representing Mozambique
African Games
Gold medal – first place	2015 Brazzaville	200 m T12
IPC Athletics World Championships
Bronze medal – third place	2015 Doha	400 m T12
Paralympic Games
Bronze medal – third place	2016 Rio de Janeiro	400 m T12

Edmilsa Governo (born 28 February 1998) is a Mozambican athlete, who won a bronze medal in the women's 400 metres T12 event at the 2016 Summer Paralympics. She also won a gold medal in the 200 metres T12 event at the 2015 African Games, and a bronze medal in the 400 metres T12 event at the 2015 IPC Athletics World Championships.

== Personal life ==
Governo was born on 28 February 1998 in Maputo, Mozambique. She started racing at the age of 8. Governo has cited fellow Mozambican athlete Maria Mutola, who competed at six Olympic Games as an inspiration.

== Career ==
In 2015, Governo won the 200 metres T12 event at the 2015 African Games, and came third in the 400 metres T12 race at the 2015 IPC Athletics World Championships in Doha, Qatar. In 2016, she won the 200 metres T12 event at the IPC Athletics Grand Prix in Tunis, Tunisia.

At the age of 18, Governo competed at the 2016 Summer Paralympics. She was the only Mozambican athlete at the Games, and as such was the country's flag bearer at the Parade of Nations. She competed in the women's 100 metres T12 and 400 metres T12 races. In the semi-finals of the 400 metres T12 event, she set an African continental record time of 54.99 seconds. Her time was the third quickest time of the round. In the final, Governo broke the African continental record again, finishing third in a time of 53.89 seconds. She lost to Ukrainian Oksana Boturchuk in a sprint finish; Boturshuk finished second in the race. Governo was Mozambique's first medalist at a Paralympic Games. In the 100 metres T12 event, Governo came third in her semi-final, in a national record time of 12.35. She did not qualify for the final. In 2017, Governo failed to qualify for the 2017 World Para Athletics Championships in London.

Governo and Hilario Chavela were Mozambique's flag bearers at the 2020 Summer Paralympics Parade of Nations. At the delayed Games, she came last in her heat in the 100 metres T13 event. She won her 400 metres T13 heat in an African record time of 55.50 seconds, and finished fifth in the final.

Governo was scheduled to compete in the 400 metres T13 event at the 2024 Summer Paralympics, though she withdrew citing an injury. In October 2024, the Paralympic Committee of Mozambique concluded an investigation and claimed that Governo was not injured. They suspended Governo and her coach Narciso Faquir for six years.

== Honours ==
In 2015, Governo was named Mozambique's female sportsperson of the year, at the country's Gala Nacional do Desporto (National Sports Gala).
