= Omara Durand =

Cuban Paralympic athlete (born 1991)

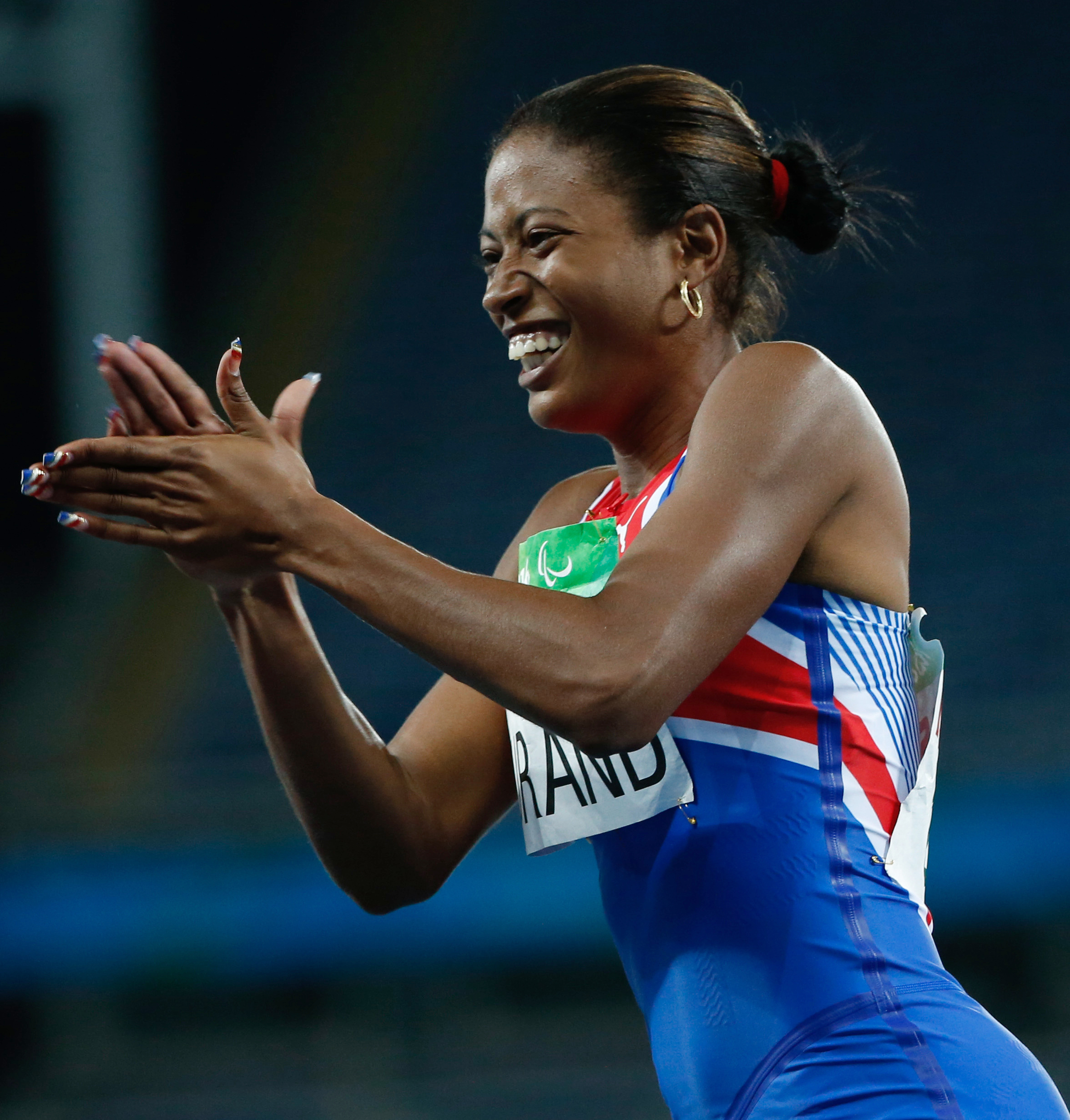
- Durand at the 2016 Paralympics

Personal information
- Full name: Omara Durand Elías
- Born: 26 November 1991 (age 34) Santiago de Cuba

Sport
- Sport: Paralympic athletics
- Disability class: T12
- Event: Sprint

Achievements and titles
- Personal bests: 100 m T12: 11.44; 200 m T12: 23.02; 400 m T12: 51.77
Medal record
Women's para athletics
Representing Cuba
Event	1st	2nd	3rd
Paralympic Games	11	0	0
World Championships	14	0	0
Parapan American Games	12	0	0
Total	37	0	0
Paralympic Games
Gold medal – first place	2012 London	100 m – T13
Gold medal – first place	2012 London	400 m – T13
Gold medal – first place	2016 Rio de Janeiro	100 m – T12
Gold medal – first place	2016 Rio de Janeiro	200 m – T12
Gold medal – first place	2016 Rio de Janeiro	400 m – T12
Gold medal – first place	2020 Tokyo	100 m – T12
Gold medal – first place	2020 Tokyo	200 m – T12
Gold medal – first place	2020 Tokyo	400 m - T12
Gold medal – first place	2024 Paris	100 m – T12
Gold medal – first place	2024 Paris	200 m – T12
Gold medal – first place	2024 Paris	400 m – T12
World Championships
Gold medal – first place	2011 Christchurch	200 m – T13
Gold medal – first place	2011 Christchurch	400 m – T13
Gold medal – first place	2015 Doha	100 m – T12
Gold medal – first place	2015 Doha	200 m – T12
Gold medal – first place	2015 Doha	400 m – T12
Gold medal – first place	2017 London	100 m – T12
Gold medal – first place	2017 London	200 m – T12
Gold medal – first place	2017 London	400 m – T12
Gold medal – first place	2019 Dubai	100 m – T12
Gold medal – first place	2019 Dubai	200 m – T12
Gold medal – first place	2019 Dubai	100 m – T12
Gold medal – first place	2023 Paris	100 m – T12
Gold medal – first place	2023 Paris	200 m – T12
Gold medal – first place	2023 Paris	400 m – T12
Parapan American Games
Gold medal – first place	2007 Rio de Janeiro	100 m – T13
Gold medal – first place	2007 Rio de Janeiro	200 m – T13
Gold medal – first place	2007 Rio de Janeiro	400 m – T13
Gold medal – first place	2011 Guadalajara	100 m – T13
Gold medal – first place	2011 Guadalajara	400 m – T13
Gold medal – first place	2015 Toronto	100 m – T12
Gold medal – first place	2015 Toronto	200 m – T12
Gold medal – first place	2015 Toronto	400 m – T12
Gold medal – first place	2019 Lima	100 m – T12
Gold medal – first place	2019 Lima	200 m – T12
Gold medal – first place	2019 Lima	400 m – T12
Gold medal – first place	2023 Santiago	200 m – T12

Omara Durand Elías (Note: In this Spanish name, the first or paternal surname is Durand and the second or maternal family name is Elías.) (born 26 November 1991 in Santiago de Cuba) is a visually impaired Cuban sprinter, who competes in T12 and T13 events. At the 2012 Summer Paralympics in London, she won gold medals in the 100 m – T13 and 400 m – T13 competitions. At the 2016 Rio Paralympics she won the 100 m – T12 event, setting a new world record at 11.40. At the 2020 Summer Paralympics, she won a gold medal in the Women's 400m T12.

== Career ==
She competed at the 2011 World Championships, 2015 Parapan American Games, and 2015 Doha World Championships.

Following the 2016 Paralympics, Durand was named Best Female at the Paralympic Sport Awards.
