= 2014 IPC Athletics European Championships – Women's 100 metres =

The women's 100 metres at the 2014 IPC Athletics European Championships was held at the Swansea University Stadium from 18–23 August.

== Medalists ==
Event	Gold		Silver		Bronze	
T11	Öznur Alumur; Turkey	13.67	Elvina Vidot; France	13.79	Arjola Dedaj; Italy	13.92
T12	Oxana Boturchuk; Ukraine	12.16	Katrin Mueller-Rottgardt; Germany	12.50	Hana Kolníková; Slovakia	13.13
T13	Erin McBride; Great Britain	13.58	—N/a		—N/a	
T34	Hannah Cockroft; Great Britain	18.53	Amy Siemons; Netherlands	19.99	Melissa Nicholls; Great Britain	20.82
T34	Maria Lyle; Great Britain	14.92	Oxana Corso; Italy	16.51	Svitlana Mykytina; Ukraine	17.21
T36	Aygyul Sakhibzadaeva; Russia	15.25	Claudia Nicoleitzik; Germany	15.36	Viktoriia Andriishena; Ukraine	16.22
T37	Mandy François-Elie; France	13.92	Anna Sapozhnikova; Russia	14.07	Maria Seifert; Germany	14.41
T38	Margarita Goncharova; Russia	13.44	Sophie Hahn; Great Britain	13.72	Olivia Breen; Great Britain	13.96
T42	Martina Caironi; Italy	15.63	Vanessa Low; Germany	16.50	Jana Schmidt; Germany	16.64
T44	Marlou van Rhijn; Netherlands	13.18	Irmgard Bensusan; Germany	13.39	Laura Sugar; Great Britain	13.71
T47	Nikol Rodomakina; Russia	12.58	Alicja Fiodorow; Poland	13.10	Styliani Smaragdi; Greece	13.79
T53	Samantha Kinghorn; Great Britain	18.74	—N/a		—N/a	
T54	Amanda Kotaja; Finland	17.16	Margriet van den Broek; Netherlands	18.19	Zübeyde Süpürgeci; Turkey	18.26

== Results ==
=== T11 ===
Semifinals

Rank	Heat	Sport Class	Name	Nationality	Time	Notes
1	2	T11	Öznur Alamur	Turkey	13.84	Q, PB
2	2	T11	Elvina Vidot	France	13.89	q
3	2	T11	Arjola Dedaj	Italy	14.05	q, PB
4	1	T11	Paraskevi Kantza	Greece	14.51	Q
5	1	T11	Ronja Oja	Finland	15.27	
6	1	T11	Maria Petit Vecino	Spain	15.79	

Final

Rank	Sport Class	Name	Nationality	Time	Notes
1st place, gold medalist(s)	T11	Öznur Alamur	Turkey	13.67	SB
2nd place, silver medalist(s)	T11	Elvina Vidot	France	13.79	
3rd place, bronze medalist(s)	T11	Arjola Dedaj	Italy	13.92	PB
4	T11	Paraskevi Kantza	Greece	14.06	

=== T12 ===
Semifinals

Rank	Heat	Sport Class	Name	Nationality	Time	Notes
1	2	T12	Oxana Boturchuk	Ukraine	12.00	Q, ER
2	1	T12	Katrin Mueller-Rottgardt	Germany	12.33	Q, PB
3	1	T12	Libby Clegg	United Kingdom	12.49	q
4	2	T12	Hana Kolníková	Slovakia	12.84	q
5	1	T12	Melani Bergés Gámez	Spain	13.09	
6	2	T12	Sara Fernández Roldán	Spain	14.34	
—	2	T12	Volha Zinkevich	Germany	DQ	

Final

Rank	Sport Class	Name	Nationality	Time	Notes
1st place, gold medalist(s)	T12	Oxana Boturchuk	Ukraine	12.16	
2nd place, silver medalist(s)	T12	Katrin Mueller-Rottgardt	Germany	12.50	
3rd place, bronze medalist(s)	T12	Hana Kolníková	Slovakia	13.13	
—	T12	Libby Clegg	United Kingdom	DNS	

=== T13 ===
Final

Rank	Sport Class	Name	Nationality	Time	Notes
1st place, gold medalist(s)	T13	Erin McBride	United Kingdom	13.58	
2	T13	Janne Sophie Engeleiter	Germany	14.12	

=== T34 ===
Final

Rank	Sport Class	Name	Nationality	Time	Notes
1st place, gold medalist(s)	T34	Hannah Cockroft	United Kingdom	18.53	
2nd place, silver medalist(s)	T34	Amy Siemons	Netherlands	19.99	
3rd place, bronze medalist(s)	T34	Melissa Nicholls	United Kingdom	20.82	
4	T34	Desiree Vranken	Netherlands	21.14	
5	T34	Luna Jansen	Netherlands	24.63	

=== T35 ===
Final

Rank	Sport Class	Name	Nationality	Time	Notes
1st place, gold medalist(s)	T35	Maria Lyle	United Kingdom	14.92	
2nd place, silver medalist(s)	T35	Oxana Corso	Italy	16.51	SB
3rd place, bronze medalist(s)	T35	Svitlana Mykytina	Ukraine	17.21	
4	T35	Nienke Timmer	Netherlands	18.05	PB

=== T36 ===
Final

Rank	Sport Class	Name	Nationality	Time	Notes
1st place, gold medalist(s)	T36	Aygyul Sakhibzadaeva	Russia	15.25	
2nd place, silver medalist(s)	T36	Claudia Nicoleitzik	Germany	15.36	
3rd place, bronze medalist(s)	T36	Viktoriia Andriishena	Ukraine	16.22	
4	T36	Luzdary van Wanum	Netherlands	17.12	

=== T37 ===
Semifinals

Rank	Heat	Sport Class	Name	Nationality	Time	Notes
1	2	T37	Mandy François-Elie	France	14.06	Q
2	1	T37	Anna Sapozhnikova	Russia	14.28	Q, PB
3	2	T37	Jenny McLoughlin	United Kingdom	14.38	Q, PB
4	1	T37	Maria Seifert	Germany	14.41	Q
5	1	T37	Zhanna Fekolina	Russia	14.81	Q
6	2	T37	Marta Langner	Poland	14.84	Q
7	2	T37	Svetlana Sergeeva	Russia	14.87	q
8	2	T37	Heather Jameson	Ireland	15.44	q
9	1	T37	Viktoriya Kravchenko	Ukraine	15.46	
10	2	T37	Isabelle Foerder	Germany	15.49	
11	1	T37	Natalia Jasinska	Poland	16.45	
—	1	T37	Bethany Woodward	United Kingdom	DNS	

Final

Rank	Sport Class	Name	Nationality	Time	Notes
1st place, gold medalist(s)	T37	Mandy François-Elie	France	13.92	
2nd place, silver medalist(s)	T37	Anna Sapozhnikova	Russia	14.07	PB
3rd place, bronze medalist(s)	T37	Maria Seifert	Germany	14.41	
4	T37	Zhanna Fekolina	Russia	14.44	PB
5	T37	Jenny McLoughlin	United Kingdom	14.52	
6	T37	Svetlana Sergeeva	Russia	14.71	SB
7	T37	Marta Langner	Poland	15.09	
8	T37	Heather Jameson	Ireland	15.64	

=== T38 ===
Final

Rank	Sport Class	Name	Nationality	Time	Notes
1st place, gold medalist(s)	T38	Margarita Goncharova	Russia	13.44	
2nd place, silver medalist(s)	T38	Sophie Hahn	United Kingdom	13.72	
3rd place, bronze medalist(s)	T38	Olivia Breen	United Kingdom	13.96	
4	T38	Inna Stryzhak	Ukraine	14.25	
5	T38	Anezka Vejrazkova	Czech Republic	15.69	SB

=== T42 ===
Final

Rank	Sport Class	Name	Nationality	Time	Notes
1st place, gold medalist(s)	T42	Martina Caironi	Italy	15.63	
2nd place, silver medalist(s)	T42	Vanessa Low	Germany	16.50	
3	T42	Jana Schmidt	Germany	16.64	

=== T44 ===
Final

Rank	Sport Class	Name	Nationality	Time	Notes
1st place, gold medalist(s)	T43	Marlou van Rhijn	Netherlands	13.18	
2nd place, silver medalist(s)	T44	Irmgard Bensusan	Germany	13.39	
3rd place, bronze medalist(s)	T44	Laura Sugar	United Kingdom	13.71	PB
4	T44	Marlene van Gansewinkel	Netherlands	14.11	
5	T44	Stef Reid	United Kingdom	14.30	
6	T44	Sophie Kamlish	United Kingdom	14.35	
7	T44	Iris Pruysen	Netherlands	15.23	

=== T47 ===
Final

Rank	Sport Class	Name	Nationality	Time	Notes
1st place, gold medalist(s)	T47	Nikol Rodomakina	Russia	12.58	SB
2nd place, silver medalist(s)	T47	Alicja Fiodorow	Poland	13.10	
3rd place, bronze medalist(s)	T47	Styliani Smaragdi	Greece	13.79	
4	T46	Dilba Tanrikulu	Turkey	14.15	

=== T53 ===
Final

Rank	Sport Class	Name	Nationality	Time	Notes
1st place, gold medalist(s)	T53	Samantha Kinghorn	United Kingdom	18.74	
2	T53	Hamide Kurt	Turkey	18.97	PB

=== T54 ===
Final

Rank	Sport Class	Name	Nationality	Time	Notes
1st place, gold medalist(s)	T54	Amanda Kotaja	Finland	17.16	
2nd place, silver medalist(s)	T54	Margriet van den Broek	Netherlands	18.19	
3rd place, bronze medalist(s)	T54	Zübeyde Süpürgeci	Turkey	18.26	
4	T54	Georgina Oliver	United Kingdom	18.30	
5	T54	Alexandra Helbling	Switzerland	18.40	
6	T54	Gunilla Wallengren	Sweden	18.64	

== See also ==
- List of IPC world records in athletics
