= 2014 IPC Athletics European Championships – Women's long jump =

The women's long jump at the 2014 IPC Athletics European Championships was held at the Swansea University Stadium from 18 to 23 August.

== Medalists ==
Event	Gold		Silver		Bronze	
T11	Viktoria Karlsson; Sweden	4.48	Arjola Dedaj; Italy	4.10	Elisa Montonen; Finland	3.90
T12	Sara Martínez Puntero; Spain	5.35	Katrin Mueller-Rottgardt; Germany	5.21	Sara Fernandez Roldan; Spain	4.42
T20	Mikela Ristoski; Croatia	5.44	Kristina Minakova; Russia	5.25	Olena Rozdobudko; Ukraine	5.15
T37	Anna Sapozhnikova; Russia	4.46 ER	Zhanna Fekolina; Russia	4.42	Franziska Liebhardt; Germany	4.34
T38	Margarita Goncharova; Russia	4.86	Inna Stryzhak; Ukraine	4.63	Ramunė Adomaitienė; Lithuania	4.58
T42	Vanessa Low; Germany	4.24	Martina Caironi; Italy	4.07	Jana Schmidt; Germany	3.67
T44	Stef Reid; Great Britain	5.32	Marie-Amelie le Fur; France	5.28	Iris Pruysen; Netherlands	4.88
T47	Nikol Rodomakina; Russia	5.50	Styliani Smaragdi; Greece	4.89	—N/a	

== See also ==
- List of IPC world records in athletics
