= Svetlana Sergeeva =

Russian Paralympic athlete

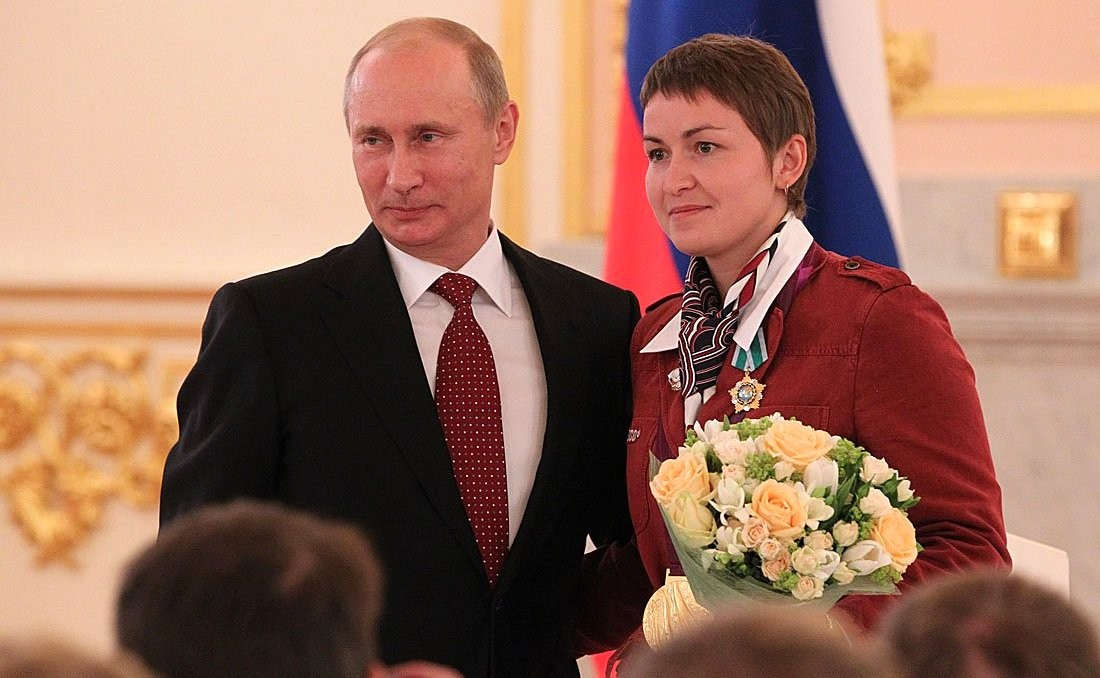
- Sergeeva receiving the Order of Friendship from President Vladimir Putin in 2012

Personal information
- Nationality: Russian
- Born: 26 March 1986 (age 40) Kargopol, Russia

Sport
- Country: Russia
- Sport: Paralympic athletics
- Disability class: T37
- Events: Sprint; Javelin; Shot put
Medal record
Track and field (T37)
Representing Russia
Paralympic Games
Gold medal – first place	2012 London	4 × 100 m relay T35/T38
IPC World Championships
Gold medal – first place	2015 Doha	4 × 100 m relay – T35–38
Silver medal – second place	2011 Christchurch	4 × 100 m – T35–38
Silver medal – second place	2011 Christchurch	200m – T37
IPC European Championships
Gold medal – first place	2012 Stadskanaal	4 × 100 m – T35–38
Gold medal – first place	2014 Swansea	Javelin – T37
Gold medal – first place	2014 Swansea	4 × 100 m – T35–38
Silver medal – second place	2016 Grosseto	Javelin – T37

Svetlana Sergeeva (born 26 March 1986) is a paralympian athlete from Russia, competing mainly in category T37 throwing and sprint events. She competed in the 2008 Summer Paralympics in Beijing, China and the 2012 Games in London. At the London Games she won a track gold as part of the sprint relay and has also achieved success as an individual athlete at both World and European events.

== Personal history ==
Svetlana Sergeeva was born in 1986 in the town of Kargopol situated in Arkhangelsk Oblast, Russia. She was born with cerebral palsy. Sergeeva matriculated to the Moscow State Academy of Physical Culture where she studied Physical Education. She holds the title of Honoured Master of Sport in Russia.

As part of the celebrations leading up to the 2014 Winter Paralympics in Sochi, Sergeeva was chosen as the final torch bearer to light the cauldron at the city of Arkhangelsk, the administrative centre of her home region.

== Sporting career ==
Sergeeva first became interested in sport after being inspired by her aunt, Svetlana Egorova, who was a physical education teacher. She took up athletics and in 2007 began training seriously. In 2007, she was first selected for the Russian national team and represented her country at Osaka in Japan.

In 2008 Sergeeva again represented Russia, this time at the 2008 Summer Paralympics in China. She entered three events, the javelin throw in the F35–38 category the shot put in the F37–38 category and the 100m T37. Her first event, the javelin throw, she threw a season's best of 24.60m to make the finals but failed to improve that result with her final three throws and finished in eighth place. The next day, she took part in the joint F37–38 shot put event scoring 836 failing to make the final. Her final event was the T37 100m. In the heats she finished outside the top three but as one of the two fastest losers she qualified for the finals. On the 12 September, in the finals, she ran 15.24s, way outside her best to finish in last place.

In 2011 Sergeeva travelled with the Russian team to Christchurch, New Zealand to compete in the 2011 IPC Athletics World Championships, there she entered three sprinting events and the javelin. With no T37 javelin event, she was forced to enter the T38 category with athletes deemed to have greater motor control. She finished in eighth place. In the sprints she finished sixth in the 100m T37, but in the 200m event she came second in 31.02s to win silver, her first major competitive medal. At the same tournament she also ran in the women's 4 × 100 m relay in the T35–38 category. The Russian team finished second giving Sergeeva her second silver of the championships.

A year later Sergeeva was part of the Russian team at the 2012 IPC Athletics European Championships in Stadskanaal. She medaled in one event, the women's 4 × 100 metres relay. Along with compatriots Anastasiya Ovsyannikova, Elena Ivanova and Margarita Goncharova, the team finished in first from a field of three to qualify for the 2012 Summer Paralympics and take Sergeeva's first gold medal at a major international competition.

A month later Sergeeva travelled to London to participate in the 2012 Summer Paralympics. Although a F37/38 javelin event was part of the schedule Sergeeva did not take part. Instead she entered three sprint events, the 100m T37, the 200m T37 and the 4 × 100 m women's relay T35–38. In both her individual sprints she failed to qualify for the finals, going out in the heats. There were no qualifiers for the relay with six countries participating in the final. On the 4 September Sergeeva again lined up with Ovsyannikova, Ivanova and Goncharova, and the team finished with a time of 54.86 to take the gold medal. For her medal success at London, Sergeeva was awarded the Order of Friendship by President Vladimir Putin in September 2012.

In a disappointing 2013 IPC Athletics World Championships, held in Lyon, Sergeeva entered just the one event, the 100m T37 where she failed to make the final. Both her favoured javelin and relay events were not included in the program, severely reducing her level of participation. The following year Sergeeva entered the 2014 IPC Athletics European Championships held in Swansea, this time a more sympathetic program of events allowed her to compete for three titles, the javelin T37, 100m T37 and the women's 4 × 100 m relay T35–38. Despite posting a season's best of 14.71s in the 100m final, it was still 3 tenths of a second outside the medal places, with Sergeeva finishing sixth. In the javelin she threw a distance of 24.01 to secure her first individual major international gold medal, beating teammate Irina Vertinskaya into silver medal position. In the relay Sergeeva and Goncharova were joined by Zhanna Fekolina and Anna Sapozhnikova to take gold and continue Russia's dominance in the event.
