= 2015 IPC Athletics World Championships – Women's shot put =

The women's shot put at the 2015 IPC Athletics World Championships was held at the Suheim Bin Hamad Stadium in Doha from 22 to 31 October.

== Medalists ==
Event	Gold		Silver		Bronze	
F12	Assunta Legnante (F11); Italy	14.02	Sofia Oksem (F12); Russia	13.60 WR	Rebeca Valenzuela Alvarez (F12); Mexico	12.70
F20	Ewa Durska; Poland	13.92 PB	Antonina Baranova; Russia	13.41 PB	Anastasiia Mysnyk; Ukraine	12.89 PB
F32	Maroua Ibrahmi; Tunisia	6.18 SB	Mounia Gasmi; Algeria	4.54	Louise Ellery; Australia	4.53
F33	Svetlana Krivenok; Russia	6.30 SB	Brydee Moore; Australia	5.31 SB	Anthi Liagkou; Greece	4.85
F34	Zou Lijuan; China	8.37 PB	Jessica Hamill; New Zealand	7.83 PB	Lucyna Kornobys; Poland	7.38
F35	Mariia Pomazan; Ukraine	13.05 WR	Wang Jun; China	12.23 AR	Marivana Oliveira; Brazil	9.17 AR
F36	Wu Qing; China	10.07 SB	Alla Malchyk; Ukraine	9.21	Aida Bronskaia; Russia	8.62
F37	Mi Na; China	13.56 WR	Franziska Liebhardt; Germany	13.39 AR	Irina Vertinskaya; Russia	12.10 PB
F40	Lauritta Onye; Nigeria	7.72 WR	Lara Baars; Netherlands	6.80 AR	Rima Abdelli; Tunisia	6.75
F41	Raoua Tlili; Tunisia	9.78 SB	Kelly Cristina Peixoto; Brazil	7.84 PB	Claire Keefer; Australia	7.62 AR
F44	Yao Juan; China	13.44 WR	Yang Yue; China	11.75	Frederike Koleiski; Germany	11.75
F53	Dimitra Korokida; Greece	4.36 PB	Pamela LeJean; Canada	4.34 SB	Deirdre Mongan; Ireland	4.02
F54	Yang Liwan; China	7.64 CR	Mariia Bogacheva; Russia	7.56 SB	Elizabeth Gomes; Brazil	6.53
F55	Marianne Buggenhagen; Germany	7.96 SB	Marie Hawkeswood; Germany	7.44	Daniela Todorova; Bulgaria	7.12 PB
F57	Stela Eneva; Bulgaria	11.14 AR	Angeles Oritz Hernandez; Mexico	11.13 SB	Ilke Wyludda; Germany	10.95SB
WR world record | AR area record | CR championship record | GR games record | NR national record | OR Olympic record | PB personal best | SB season best | WL world leading (in a given season)

== See also ==
- List of IPC world records in athletics
