= 2014 IPC Athletics European Championships – Women's 200 metres =

The women's 200 metres at the 2014 IPC Athletics European Championships was held at the Swansea University Stadium from 18 to 23 August.

== Medalists ==
Event	Gold		Silver		Bronze	
T11	Öznur Alumur; Turkey	28.69	Arjola Dedaj; Italy	29.11	Ronja Oja; Finland	32.60
T12	Oxana Boturchuk; Ukraine	24.72	Katrin Mueller-Rottgardt; Germany	25.30	Anna Sorokina; Russia	26.49
T35	Maria Lyle; United Kingdom	31.05	Oxana Corso; Italy	34.37	Svitlana Mykytina; Ukraine	36.15
T36	Claudia Nicoleitzik; Germany	32.26	Aygyul Sakhibzadaeva; Russia	33.49	Viktoriia Andriishena; Ukraine	35.08
T44	Marlou van Rhijn (T43); Netherlands	26.89	Irmgard Bensusan (T44); Germany	27.22	Laura Sugar (T44); United Kingdom	28.75

== Results ==
=== T11 ===
Semifinals

Rank	Heat	Sport Class	Name	Nationality	Time	Notes
1	1	T11	Öznur Alamur	Turkey	28.20	Q, PB
2	2	T11	Arjola Dedaj	Italy	29.58	Q
3	2	T11	Ronja Oja	Finland	33.16	q
4	1	T11	Elisa Montonen	Finland	33.74	q
—	2	T11	Elvina Vidot	France	DNF	

Final

Rank	Sport Class	Name	Nationality	Time	Notes
1st place, gold medalist(s)	T11	Öznur Alamur	Turkey	28.69	
2nd place, silver medalist(s)	T11	Arjola Dedaj	Italy	29.11	
3rd place, bronze medalist(s)	T11	Ronja Oja	Finland	32.60	
4	T11	Elisa Montonen	Finland	33.53	

=== T12 ===
Semifinals

Rank	Heat	Sport Class	Name	Nationality	Time	Notes
1	2	T12	Oxana Boturchuk	Ukraine	24.96	Q
2	2	T12	Katrin Mueller-Rottgardt	Germany	25.71	q
3	1	T12	Hana Kolníková	Slovakia	26.77	Q
3	2	T12	Anna Sorokina	Russia	26.77	q
5	1	T12	Melani Berges Gamez	Spain	27.18	
6	1	T12	Veronika Zotova	Russia	28.44	
7	2	T12	Sara Fernandez Roldan	Spain	30.15	

Final

Rank	Sport Class	Name	Nationality	Time	Notes
1st place, gold medalist(s)	T12	Oxana Boturchuk	Ukraine	24.72	PB
2nd place, silver medalist(s)	T12	Katrin Mueller-Rottgardt	Germany	25.30	PB
3rd place, bronze medalist(s)	T12	Anna Sorokina	Russia	26.49	PB
4	T12	Hana Kolníková	Slovakia	26.91	

=== T35 ===
Final

Rank	Sport Class	Name	Nationality	Time	Notes
1st place, gold medalist(s)	T35	Maria Lyle	United Kingdom	31.05	
2nd place, silver medalist(s)	T35	Oxana Corso	Italy	34.37	
3rd place, bronze medalist(s)	T35	Svitlana Mykytina	Ukraine	36.15	
4	T35	Nienke Timmer	Netherlands	39.37	PB

=== T36 ===
Final

Rank	Sport Class	Name	Nationality	Time	Notes
1st place, gold medalist(s)	T36	Claudia Nicoleitzik	Germany	32.26	
2nd place, silver medalist(s)	T36	Aygyul Sakhibzadaeva	Russia	33.49	
3rd place, bronze medalist(s)	T36	Viktoriia Andriishena	Ukraine	35.08	
4	T36	Luzdary van Wanum	Netherlands	36.08	

=== T44 ===
Final

Rank	Sport Class	Name	Nationality	Time	Notes
1st place, gold medalist(s)	T43	Marlou van Rhijn	Netherlands	26.89	SB
2nd place, silver medalist(s)	T44	Irmgard Bensusan	Germany	27.22	PB
3rd place, bronze medalist(s)	T44	Laura Sugar	United Kingdom	28.75	SB
4	T44	Marlene van Gansewinkel	Netherlands	29.87	PB
5	T44	Sophie Kamlish	United Kingdom	30.90	SB
6	T44	Iris Pruysen	Netherlands	31.30	

== See also ==
- List of IPC world records in athletics
