= 2015 IPC Athletics World Championships – Women's long jump =

The women's long jump at the 2015 IPC Athletics World Championships was held at the Suheim Bin Hamad Stadium in Doha from 22–31 October.

== Medalists ==
Event	Gold		Silver		Bronze	
T11	Silvânia Costa de Oliveira; Brazil	5.04 CR	Lorena Salvatini Spoladore; Brazil	4.75 PB	Viktoria Karlsson; Sweden	4.44
T12	Oksana Zubkovska; Ukraine	6.25 SB	Lynda Hamri; Algeria	5.54 SB	Sara Martinez; Spain	5.51 SB
T20	Karolina Kucharczyk; Poland	5.67	Mikela Ristoski; Croatia	5.63 SB	Olena Rozdobudko; Ukraine	5.22 PB
T37	Zhanna Fekolina; Russia	4.79 CR	Franziska Liebhardt; Germany	4.57 PB	Anna Sapozhnikova; Russia	4.56 PB
T38	Margarita Goncharova; Russia	5.09 CR	Ramunė Adomaitienė; Lithuania	4.55 SB	Inna Stryzhak; Ukraine	4.47
T42	Vanessa Low; Germany	4.79 WR	Martina Caironi; Italy	4.59	Jana Schmidt; Germany	3.73
T44	Marie-Amelie le Fur; France	5.84	Marlene van Gansewinkel; Netherlands	5.27 NR	Saki Takakuwa; Japan	5.09
T47	Carlee Beattie (T47); Australia	5.75 SB	Yunidis Castillo (T46); Cuba	5.46	Anna Grimaldi (T47); New Zealand	5.41 NR
WR world record | AR area record | CR championship record | GR games record | NR national record | OR Olympic record | PB personal best | SB season best | WL world leading (in a given season)

== See also ==
- List of IPC world records in athletics
