= 2016 IPC Athletics European Championships – Women's long jump =

The women's long jump at the 2016 IPC Athletics European Championships was held at the Stadio Olimpico Carlo Zecchini in Grosseto from 11 to 16 June.

== Medalists ==
Event	Gold		Silver		Bronze	
T11	Viktoria Karlsson; Sweden	4.59 CR	Ronja Oja; Finland	4.32	Arjola Dedaj; Italy	4.25
T12	Sara Martinez; Spain	5.53 SB	Anna Kaniuk; Belarus	5.45	Katrin Mueller-Rottgardt; Germany	5.45 SB
T20	Karolina Kucharczyk; Poland	5.87 CR	Mikela Ristoski; Croatia	5.68	Kristina Minakova; Russia	5.27 SB
T37	Zhanna Fekolina; Russia	4.89 ER	Franziska Liebhardt; Germany	4.73 PB	Anna Sapozhnikova; Russia	4.53
T38	Margarita Goncharova; Russia	5.11 CR	Ramune Adomaitiene; Lithuania	4.61	Anna Trener-Wierciak; Poland	4.43
T42-T44	Vanessa Low (T42); Germany	4.71 CR; 1080 pts	Martina Caironi (T42); Italy	4.48; 1024 pts	Marie-Amélie Le Fur (T44); France	5.69 CR; 1021 pts
T47	Aleksandra Moguchaia (T46); Russia	5.74 CR	Nikol Rodomakina; Russia	5.39	Angelina Lanza (T46); France	5.24 SB
WR world record | AR area record | CR championship record | GR games record | NR national record | OR Olympic record | PB personal best | SB season best | WL world leading (in a given season)

== See also ==
- List of IPC world records in athletics
