= Arjola =

Arjola is a feminine given name. Notable people with the name include:

- Arjola Dedaj (born 1981), Italian athlete
- Arjola Trimi (born 1987), Italian swimmer
