= 2012 IPC Athletics European Championships – Women's 4 × 100 metres relay =

The women's 4×100 metres relay at the 2012 IPC Athletics European Championships was held at the Stadskanaal Stadium from 24–29 June.

== Medalists ==
Results given by IPC Athletics.

Class	Gold	Silver	Bronze
T35-38	Anastasiya Ovsyannikova; Svetlana Sergeeva; Elena Ivanova; Margarita Goncharova; Russia	Maike Hausberger; Maria Seifert; Isabelle Foerder; Claudia Nicoleitzik; Germany	

== Results ==
Final

Rank	Sport Class	Name	Nationality	Time	Notes
1st place, gold medalist(s)	T38; T36; T37; T37	Margarita Goncharova; Elena Ivanova; Anastasiya Ovsyannikova; Svetlana Sergeeva	Russia	54.77	WR
2nd place, silver medalist(s)	T37; T37; T36; T37	Isabelle Foerder; Maike Hausberger; Claudia Nicoleitzik; Maria Seifert	Germany	58.59	
—	T37; T37; T37; T38	Viktoriya Kravchenko; Oksana Krechunyak; Maryna Snisar; Inna Stryzhak	Ukraine	DQ	

== See also ==
- List of IPC world records in athletics
