= Aliaksandr Subota =

Belarusian Paralympic athlete (born 1984)

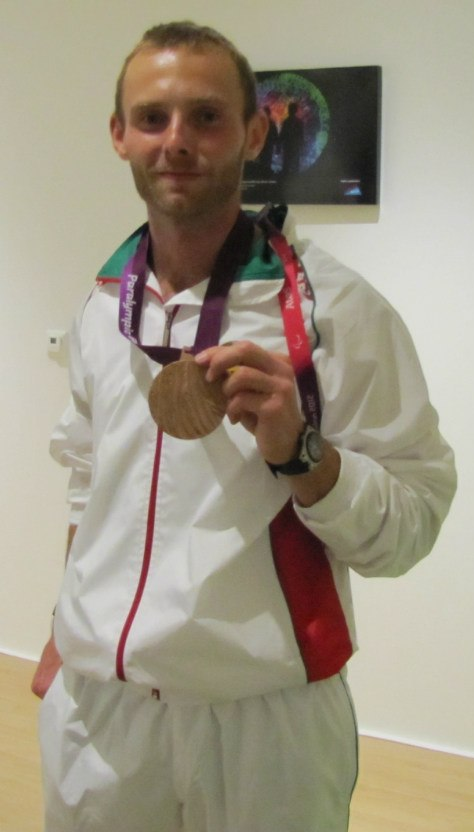
- Subota after medaling in 2012

Personal information
- Born: 28 August 1984 (age 41) Minsk, Belarus
- Height: 184 cm (72 in)

Sport
- Country: Belarus
- Sport: Athletics
- Disability class: T46
- Event(s): Javelin throw, long jump, triple jump
- Coached by: Anatoly Maystruk
Medal record
Track and field
Representing Belarus
Paralympic Games
Bronze medal – third place	2012 London	triple jump – T46
IPC World Championships
Silver medal – second place	2013 Lyon	triple jump – T46
IPC Athletics European Championships
Gold medal – first place	2012 Stadskanaal	Triple jump – T47
Gold medal – first place	2016 Grosseto	Javelin – T46
Silver medal – second place	2014 Swansea	Triple jump – T47
Bronze medal – third place	2016 Grosseto	Long jump – T47

Aliaksandr Subota (born 28 August 1984) is a Paralympian athlete from Belarus competing mainly in T46 classification track and field events.

== Athletics career ==
Subota first represented his country at a Paralympics in 2004 in Athens, where he competed in the long jump and triple jump, although he failed to achieve a podium finish in either. Subota was back in the Belarus team for the 2008 Summer Paralympics in Beijing, this time competing in just the long jump. He finished fifth. His most successful Paralympics to date was the London Games in 2012. There he competed in both the long jump and triple jump, finishing third in the triple jump to claim his first Paralympic medal.

As well as his Paralympic success, Subota has also claimed medals at both World and European Championship level. He claimed a silver in the triple jump (T46) in the 2013 World Championships in Lyon while he has won three European medals, including a gold in the T46 Javelin in 2016 in Grosseto. This was the first international competition that he had entered into the javelin event.

== Personal history ==
Subota was born in Minsk, Belarus in 1984. He studied sports coaching at Belarusian State University of Physical Training.
