= Vidot =

Vidot is a surname. Notable people with the surname include:

- Daniel Vidot (born 1990), Australian wrestler and rugby league player
- Elvina Vidot (born 1993), French Paralympic athlete
- José María de Urquinaona y Vidot (1814–1883), Spanish Roman Catholic bishop
- Julien Vidot (born 1982), French racing driver
