= 2014 IPC Athletics European Championships – Women's 4 × 100 metres relay =

The women's 4 × 100 metres relay at the 2014 IPC Athletics European Championships was held at the Swansea University Stadium from 18–23 August.

== Medalists ==
Event	Gold		Silver		Bronze
T35-38	Russia; Zhanna Fekolina (T37); Svetlana Sergeeva (T37); Anna Sapozhnikova (T37); Margarita Goncharova (T38)	53.53 WR	Great Britain; Olivia Breen (T38); Bethany Woodward (T37); Sophie Hahn (T38); Jenny McLoughlin (T37)	53.84	—

== Results ==
=== T35-38 ===
Rank	Nation	Time	Notes
1st place, gold medalist(s)	Russia	53.53	WR
2nd place, silver medalist(s)	Great Britain	53.84	NR
3	Germany	59.54	SB

== See also ==
- List of IPC world records in athletics
