= Franziska Liebhardt =

German Paralympic athlete (1982–2026)

Personal information
- Born: 5 January 1982 Berlin, Germany
- Died: 8 November 2026 (aged 44) Würzburg, Bavaria, Germany

Sport
- Sport: Athletics
- Disability class: F37
- Club: TSV Bayer 04 Leverkusen
- Coached by: Steffi Nerius
Medal record
Women's para-athletics
Representing Germany
Paralympic Games
Gold medal – first place	2016 Rio de Janeiro	Shot put - F37
Silver medal – second place	2016 Rio de Janeiro	Long jump - T37
World Championships
Silver medal – second place	2015 Doha	Shot put - F37
Silver medal – second place	2015 Doha	Long jump - T37
European Championships
Gold medal – first place	2016 Grosseto	Shot put - F37
Silver medal – second place	2014 Swansea	Shot put - F37
Silver medal – second place	2016 Grosseto	Long jump - T37
Bronze medal – third place	2014 Swansea	Long jump - T37

Franziska Liebhardt (5 January 1982 – 8 November 2026) was a German Paralympic athlete. She competed in throwing events in the F37 classification and in the long jump in the T37 classification. As of September 2016, she holds the women's F37 world record in the shot put, which she set whilst competing at the 2016 Summer Paralympics in Rio de Janeiro.

Liebhardt died in Würzburg on 8 November 2026, at the age of 44.
