= Anna Kulinich-Sorokina =

Russian Paralympic athlete (born 1992)

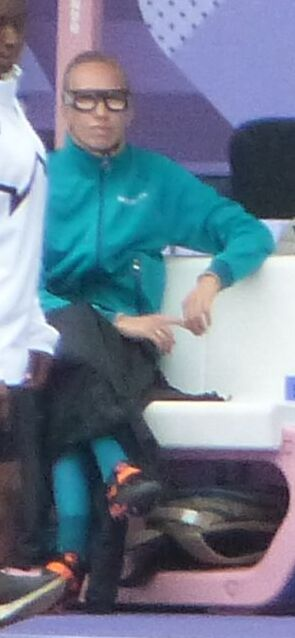

Personal information
- Born: 27 June 1992 (age 34) Cheboksary, Russia
- Height: 174 cm (5 ft 9 in)

Sport
- Country: Russia
- Sport: Athletics
- Disability class: T12, F12
- Event(s): sprint, javelin
- Club: Ufa School of Supreme Sports Skill
- Coached by: Boris Afanasyev
Medal record
Paralympic athletics
Representing Neutral Paralympic Athletes
Paralympic Games
Silver medal – second place	2024 Paris	Javelin throw F13
World Championships
Gold medal – first place	2025 New Delhi	400 m T12
Bronze medal – third place	2025 New Delhi	Javelin throw F13
Representing RPC
Bronze medal – third place	2020 Tokyo	200 m – T12
Representing Russia
Paralympic Games
Silver medal – second place	2012 London	Javelin – F12/13
World Championships
Gold medal – first place	2013 Lyon	Javelin – F12/13
Silver medal – second place	2015 Doha	Javelin – F12/13
Silver medal – second place	2015 Doha	4 × 100 m relay – F11/13
Silver medal – second place	2019 Dubai	Javelin – F12/13
European Championships
Gold medal – first place	2014 Swansea	Javelin – F12
Silver medal – second place	2014 Swansea	400 m – F12
Bronze medal – third place	2014 Swansea	200 m – F12
Gold medal – first place	2016 Grosseto	Javelin – F11–13
Gold medal – first place	2016 Grosseto	4 × 100 m relay T11–13
Silver medal – second place	2016 Grosseto	200 m – F12

Anna Kulinich-Sorokina (born 27 June 1992) is a visually impaired Paralympian athlete from Russia competing mainly in T12 classification and F12 classification sprint and javelin throw events.

== Biography ==
She was born on June 27, 1992 in Cheboksary. Her father, Yuri Florovich Sorokin, is a native of the village of Verkhniye Tatmyshi in the Alikovsky District of Chuvashia.

Anna is a pupil of the athletics section of Cheboksary special (correctional) secondary school for the Blind and Visually impaired. She joined the section in 2004, at the age of 12. She later graduated from Bashkir Institute of Physical Culture (Uralgufc branch).

== Sports results ==
- Olympics
  - Silver London 2012 javelin throw
  - Bronze Tokyo 2020 200 m
  - Silver Paris 2024 javelin throw
- 2013 IPC Athletics World Championships
  - Gold javelin throw
- 2014 IPC Athletics European Championships, Swansea
  - Gold javelin throw
  - Bronze 200 m
  - Silver 400 m
- Among juniors
  - U14 World Athletics Championships (2005)
    - long jump —
    - 60 m —
    - 200 m —
  - European Junior Championships (2006)
    - long jump —
    - 400 m —
    - 800 m —

== Awards and titles ==
- Order of Friendship (October 21, 2024) — for his great contribution to the development of national sports, high sporting achievements, the will to win, perseverance and determination shown at the XVII Paralympic Summer Games in 2024 in Paris (France).
- Medal of the Order of Merit for the Fatherland, II degree (September 10, 2012) — for his great contribution to the development of physical culture and sports, high sporting achievements at the XIV Paralympic Summer Games 2012 in London (Great Britain).
- Honored Master of Sports of Russia (2012).

== Family ==
- Her husband, Ivan Kulinich, is a massage therapist for the Russian national athletics team.
  - Daughter — Sofia.
