= Jade Jones-Hall =

English wheelchair racer (born 1996)

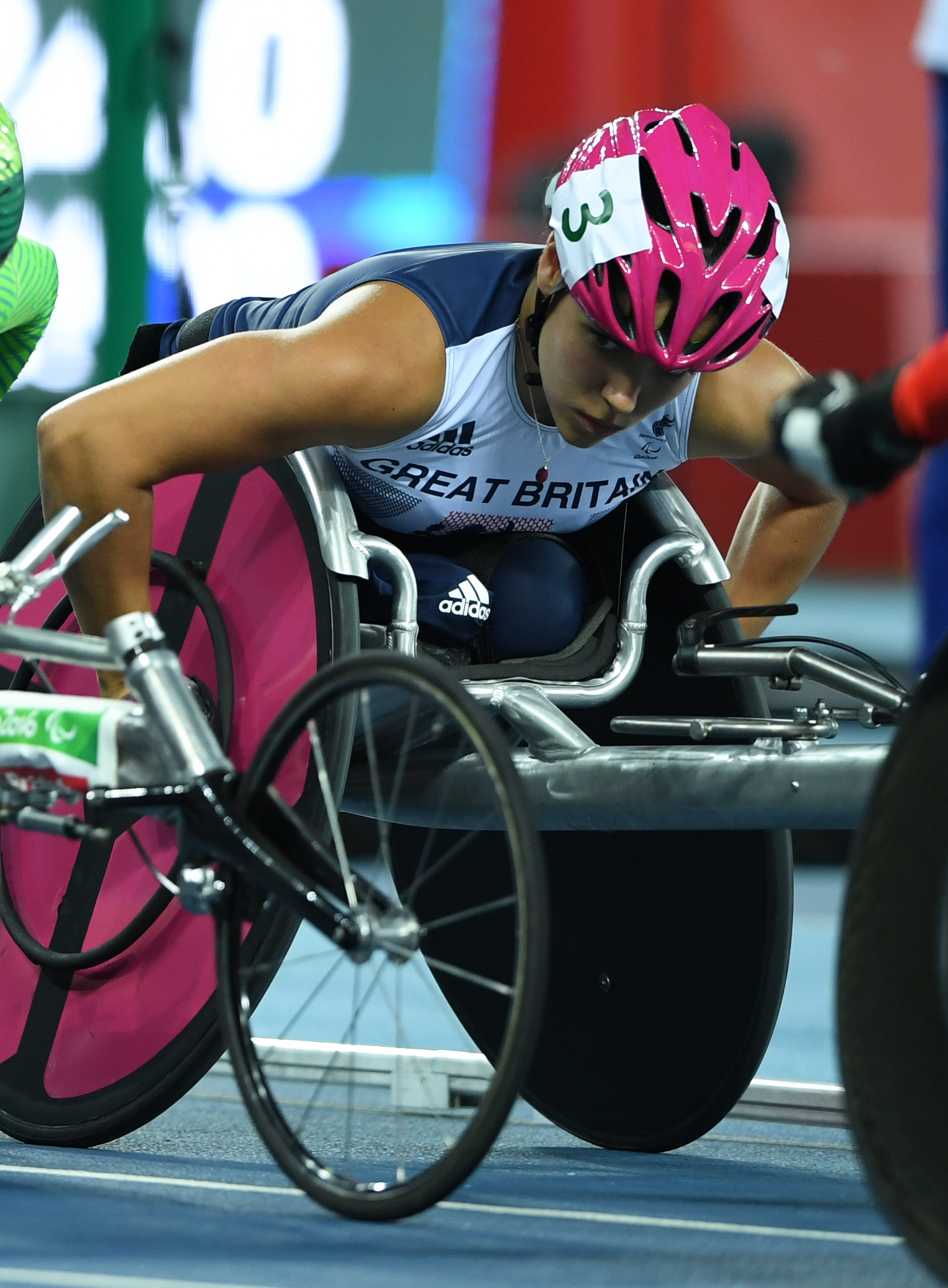
- Jade Jones in Rio 2016

Personal information
- Nationality: British
- Born: 4 January 1996 (age 30) Middlesbrough, England

Sport
- Country: Great Britain
- Sport: Athletics, paratriathlon
- Event: Wheelchair racing
- Club: New Marske
- Coached by: Tanni Grey-Thompson; Ian Thompson

Achievements and titles
- Paralympic finals: 2012
- Personal bests: 400 m: 55.91; 800 m: 1:51.55; 1500 m: 3:25.07; 5000 m: 11:56.31
Medal record
Women's para-athletics
Representing Great Britain
European Championships
Silver medal – second place	2014 Swansea	800 m T54
Bronze medal – third place	2014 Swansea	5000 m T54
Representing England
Commonwealth Games
Bronze medal – third place	2014 Glasgow	1500 m T54
Bronze medal – third place	2018 Gold Coast	Marathon T54
Women's paratriathlon
Representing Great Britain
World Championships
Silver medal – second place	2017 Rotterdam	PTWC
European Championships
Gold medal – first place	2017 Kitzbühel	PTWC
Bronze medal – third place	2019 Valencia	PTWC
Representing England
Commonwealth Games
Gold medal – first place	2018 Gold Coast	PTWC

Jade Jones-Hall (born 4 January 1996), known previously as Jade Jones, is an English wheelchair racer, competing in T54 events, and a paratriathlete competing in handbike-to-wheelchair classifications. Jones competed in the 2012 Summer Paralympics in the 400m, 800m and 1500m. In 2018, she won the gold medal in Paratriathlon at the 2018 Commonwealth Games.

== Personal history ==
Jones was born in Middlesbrough, England in 1996. She was born with a missing femur. Jones is a former pupil of Ormesby School in Middlesbrough and Prior Pursglove College in Guisborough, and began studying law at the University of Teesside in September 2014.

== Athletic career ==
Jones was invited by wheelchair athlete, Tanni Grey-Thompson and her husband (and personal coach) Ian Thompson, to try out a racing chair during a school sports day visit. Within a few weeks Jones was training under Grey-Thompson and began entering competitive sport meets in 2009. Competing in sprint racing and long-distance events, Jones trained with the New Markse club. In 2011, she competed in the IPC Athletics World Championships in New Zealand. She finished 5th in T54 200m race.

Jones recorded personal bests in the 400 m, 800 m and 1500 m in 2012, and qualified in all three events for the 2012 Summer Paralympics. Jones failed to qualify for the finals in both the 400 m and 800 m, finishing sixth and fifth respectively. In the 1500 m she qualified through finishing 5th in the preliminary heat, but failed to medal, coming last in the finals three seconds behind the winner Tatyana McFadden of the United States.

In September 2012 Jones entered the Great North Run. Competing in the Junior Wheelchair event, she won the Tyne Tunnel 2k race in 4 minutes 12 seconds.

In 2013, Jones qualified for the IPC Athletics World Championships in Lyon. She raced in the T54 classification distance races, reaching the finals of the 400 m, 800 m, 1500 m and 5000 m. Her best finish was fourth in the 400 m.

In 2014 Jones won her first major international medals, whilst representing Great Britain at the IPC European Championships in Swansea. She took silver in the 800m along with a bronze in the 5,000m. Jones completed the year by winning a silver in the T54 women's race at the Commonwealth Games in Glasgow. In July 2016 it was announced that Jones had been selected for her second Paralympics, in Rio. In 2018 at the British Commonwealth Games, hosted at Gold Coast Australia, she was the commonwealth champion in the paratrialthon, finishing in a time of 1 hour 11 minutes and 7 seconds.

== Achievements ==
Year	Competition	Venue	Position	Event	Notes
2013	Reading Half Marathon	Reading, United Kingdom	1st	Half marathon	1:09:11
