= Martina Caironi =

Italian Paralympic athlete (born 1989)

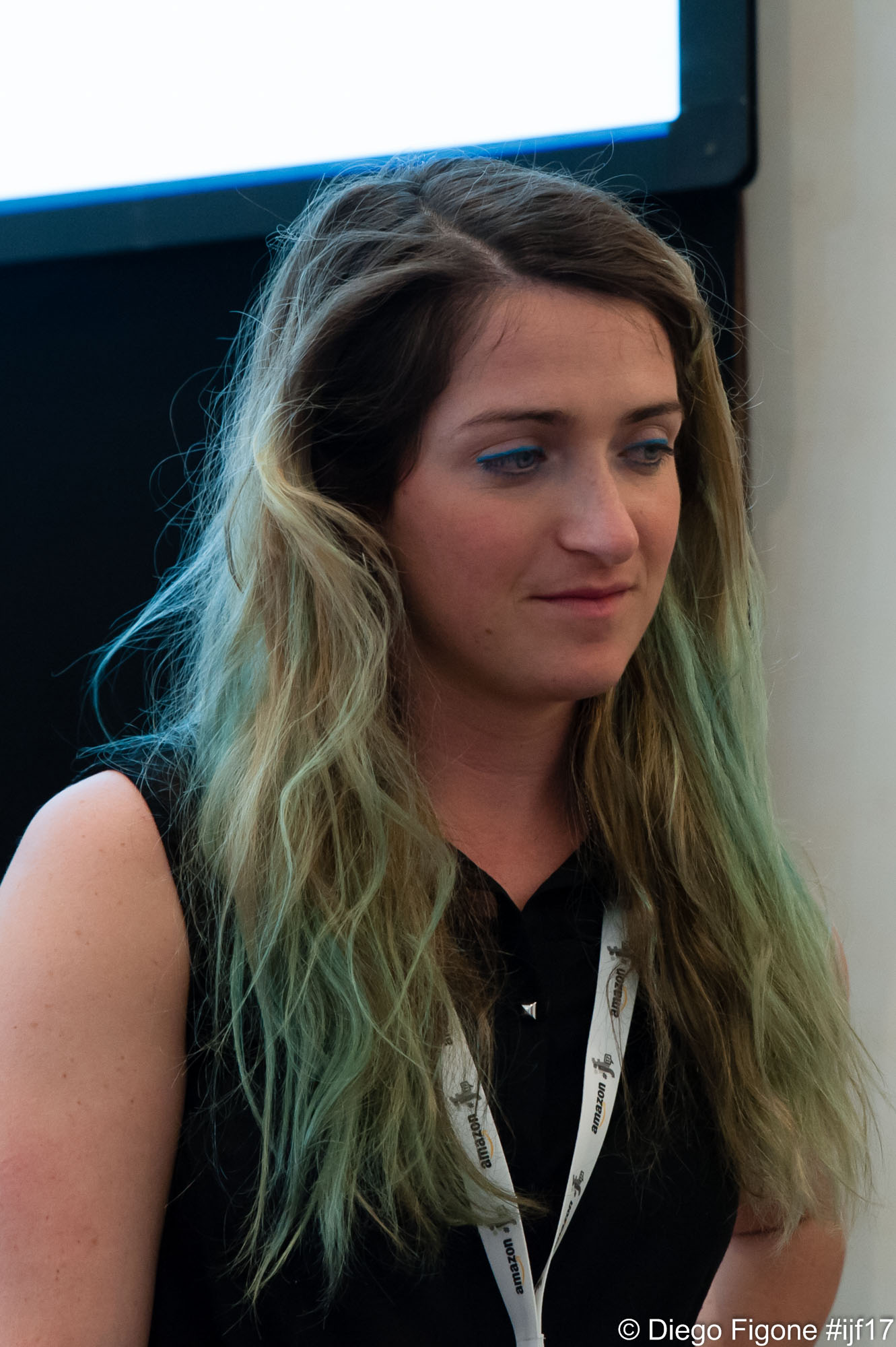
- Caironi in 2016

Personal information
- Nationality: Italian
- Born: 13 September 1989 (age 37) Alzano Lombardo, Italy

Sport
- Sport: Paralympic athletics
- Disability class: T42
- Club: Fiamme Gialle
- Coached by: Mario Poletti

Achievements and titles
- Personal bests: 100 m T42: 14.61; Long jump T42: 4.66 m
Medal record
Women's para athletics
Representing Italy
Event	1st	2nd	3rd
Paralympic Games	3	4	0
World Championships	6	2	0
European Championships	6	2	0
Total	15	8	0
Paralympic Games
Gold medal – first place	2012 London	100 m – T42
Gold medal – first place	2016 Rio	100 m – T42
Gold medal – first place	2024 Paris	100 m – T63
Silver medal – second place	2016 Rio	Long jump – T42
Silver medal – second place	2020 Tokyo	100 m – T63
Silver medal – second place	2020 Tokyo	Long jump –T63
Silver medal – second place	2024 Paris	Long jump – T63
World Championships
Gold medal – first place	2013 Lyon	100m – T42
Gold medal – first place	2013 Lyon	Long jump – T42
Gold medal – first place	2015 Doha	100m – T42
Gold medal – first place	2017 London	100m – T42
Gold medal – first place	2017 London	Long jump – T42
Gold medal – first place	2023 Paris	Long jump – T63
Silver medal – second place	2015 Doha	Long jump – T42
European Championships
Gold medal – first place	2012 Stadskanaal	100m – T42
Gold medal – first place	2014 Swansea	100m – T42
Gold medal – first place	2016 Grosseto	100m – T42
Gold medal – first place	2023 Paris	Long jump – T63
Silver medal – second place	2014 Swansea	Long jump – T42
Silver medal – second place	2016 Grosseto	Long jump – T42-44
Bronze medal – third place	2012 Stadskanaal	Long jump – F42/44/46

Martina Caironi (born 13 September 1989) is an Italian Paralympic athlete. She competed at the 2012 Summer Paralympics and 2016 Summer Paralympics. She won a gold medal in the 100 m sprint in 2012 and a silver in the long jump in 2016. She qualified for the 2020 Summer Paralympics.

== Biography ==
As a result of a motorcycle accident in 2007, Caironi had to undergo high-femoral amputation on her left leg.

== Disqualification ==
On 17 October 2019, she was disqualified for having been found positive for a steroid contained in a healing ointment, prescribed by her doctor, to treat a severe inflammation of the amputated leg. However, the Italian national anti-doping court, recognizing the good faith of the athlete, reduced the disqualification by one year, therefore the disqualification expired on 9 March 2020.

== World records ==
- 100 m – T42: 15.87 (London, 5 September 2012)

== Other achievements ==
Year	Competition	Venue	Position	Event	Performance	Notes
2011	IWAS World Games	(United Arab Emirates) Sharjah	3rd	Long jump F42	2.83 m	
