= Nikol Rodomakina =

Russian Paralympic athlete

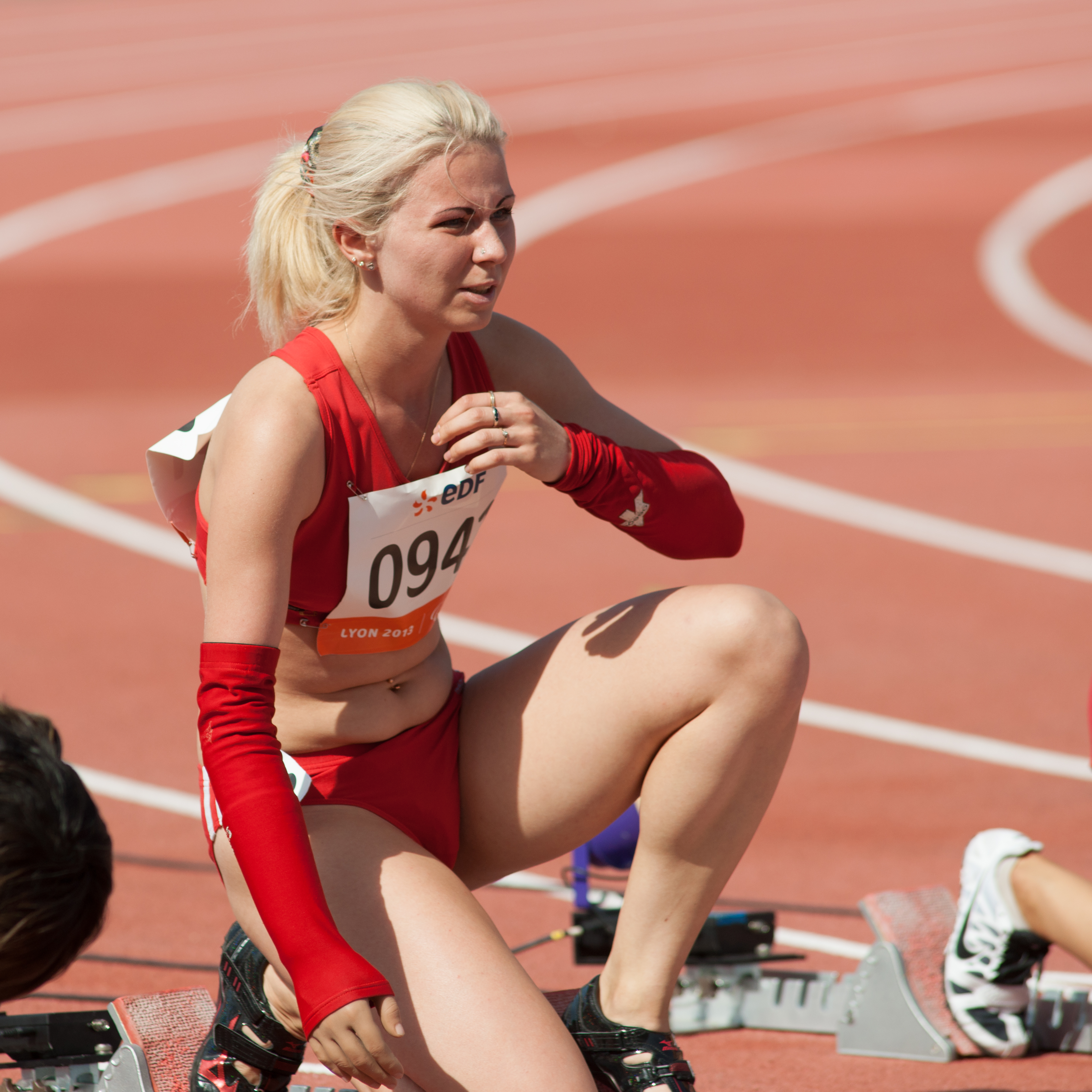
- Rodomakina at the 2013 IPC Athletics Championship

Personal information
- Nationality: Russian
- Born: 14 February 1993 (age 33)

Sport
- Sport: Athletics
- Event(s): sprint, long jump
Medal record
Women's para athletics (T46)/(F46)
Representing Russia
Event	1st	2nd	3rd
Paralympic Games	1	1	0
World Championships	2	3	0
European Championships	4	1	0
Paralympic Games
Gold medal – first place	2012 London	Long jump – F46
Silver medal – second place	2012 London	100 m – T46
World Championships
Gold medal – first place	2011 Christchurch	Long jump – F44/46
Gold medal – first place	2013 Lyon	Long jump – F46
Silver medal – second place	2011 Christchurch	100 m – T46
Silver medal – second place	2011 Christchurch	200 m – T46
Silver medal – second place	2013 Lyon	100 m – T46
European Championships
Gold medal – first place	2012 Stadskanaal	100 m – T46
Gold medal – first place	2012 Stadskanaal	200 m – T46
Gold medal – first place	2014 Swansea	100 m – T47
Gold medal – first place	2014 Swansea	Long jump – T47
Silver medal – second place	2016 Grosseto	Long jump – T47

Nikol Rodomakina (Russian: Николь Родомакина, born 14 February 1993) is a Paralympic athlete from Russia competing mainly in category T46 sprint and F46 long jump events. Between 2011 and 2013 Rodomakina was World, Paralympic and European champion in the F46 long jump.

== Career history ==
Rodomakina competed in her first Summer Paralympics at the 2008 Games in Beijing, China. She entered both the women's 100 metres and 200 metres sprints in the T46 classification. She qualified for the finals for both events, but failed to medal in either finishing 5th in the 100m and 7th in the 200m.

In 2011 Rodomakina entered the 2011 IPC Athletics World Championships in Christchurch, New Zealand. She took the silver in both her sprint events, the 100m and 200m T46 races. She also qualified for the F44/46 long jump and took the gold medal after posting a distance of 5.67m in her final jump.

At the 2012 Summer Paralympics in London, Rodomakina competed in the 100 metres, 200 metres and the long jump. She won a silver medal in the women's 100 metres T46 event, but failed to reach the podium in the 200 metres, finishing one hundredth of a second behind bronze medalist Anrune Liebenberg of South Africa. She also continued her success in the long jump, this time competing in the F46 classification, again taking the gold medal.

At the 2013 IPC Athletics World Championships in Lyon she entered the 100m T46 sprint and the T46 long jump. She won silver in the sprint but successfully defended her long jump world title posting a personal best of 5.92m.
