= Mikela Ristoski =

Croatian Paralympic athlete (born 1989)

Personal information
- Nationality: Croatian
- Born: 7 November 1989 (age 36) Pula, SR Croatia, SFR Yugoslavia

Sport
- Sport: Track and field
- Disability class: T20
- Event: long jump
- Club: AKOSI Medulin:
- Coached by: Danijal Temin
Medal record
Women's para athletics
Representing Croatia
Paralympic Games
Gold medal – first place	2016 Rio de Janeiro	Long jump F20
Bronze medal – third place	2012 London	Long jump F20
Bronze medal – third place	2020 Tokyo	Long jump F20
World Championships
Gold medal – first place	2011 Christchurch	Long jump F20
Gold medal – first place	2015 Doha	Triple jump T20
Gold medal – first place	2017 London	Long jump T20
Silver medal – second place	2015 Doha	Long jump T20
Bronze medal – third place	2013 Lyon	Long jump T20
European Championships
Gold medal – first place	2014 Swansea	Long jump T20
Silver medal – second place	2016 Grosseto	Long jump T20

Mikela Ristoski (born 7 November 1989) is a Paralympic athlete from Croatia who competes in T20 classification track and field jump events. She won bronze for Croatia at the 2012 Summer Paralympics in the long jump (F20). Ristoski is a multiple medalist at both World and European Championship levels, and has been World champion in both the long jump (2011) and triple jump (2015).
