= Maria Seifert =

German Paralympic athlete

Medal record

Track and field (T37)

Representing Germany

Paralympic Games
Bronze medal – third place	2008 Beijing	100m – T37
Bronze medal – third place	2008 Beijing	200m – T37
Bronze medal – third place	2012 London	200m – T37

World Championships
Silver medal – second place	2011 Christchurch	100m – T37
Silver medal – second place	2013 Lyon	100m- T37

European Championships
Gold medal – first place	2012 Stadskanaal	100m- T37
Gold medal – first place	2012 Stadskanaal	200m- T37
Silver medal – second place	2012 Stadskanaal	4 × 100 m- T35–38
Bronze medal – third place	2014 Swansea	100m – T37

Maria Seifert (born 15 May 1991) is a Paralympian athlete from Germany competing mainly in category T37 sprint events.

She competed in the 2008 Summer Paralympics in Beijing, China, where she won a bronze medal in the women's 100 metres – T37 event and a bronze medal in the women's 200 metres – T37 event.
