= 2013 IPC Athletics World Championships – Women's long jump =

The women's long jump at the 2013 IPC Athletics World Championships was held at the Stade du Rhône from 20 to 29 July.

== Medalists ==
Class	Gold	Silver	Bronze
T11	Lorena Spoladore; Brazil	Paraskevi Kantza; Greece	Jia Juntingxian; China
T12	Oksana Zubkovska; Ukraine	Lynda Hamri; Algeria	Sara Martinez Puntero; Spain
T13	Ilse Hayes; South Africa	Sanaa Benhama; Morocco	N/A
T20	Karolina Kucharczyk; Poland	Krestina Zhukova; Russia	Mikela Ristoski; Croatia
T37/38	Margarita Goncharova; Russia	Ramune Adomaitiene; Lithuania	Maria Fernandes; Portugal
T42	Martina Caironi; Italy	Jana Schmidt; Germany	Vanessa Low; Germany
T44	Iris Pruysen; Netherlands	Marie-Amélie Le Fur; France	Mami Sato; Japan
T46	Nikol Rodomakina; Russia	Carlee Beattie; Australia	Sheila Finder; Brazil

== See also ==
- List of IPC world records in athletics
