= Jana Schmidt =

German Paralympic athlete (born 1972)

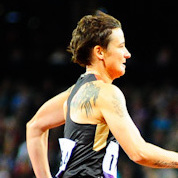
- taking bronze in 2012

Personal information
- Nationality: German
- Born: 13 December 1972 (age 53) Teterow, Bezirk Neubrandenburg, East Germany
- Home town: Rostock, German

Sport
- Country: Germany
- Sport: Athletics
- Disability class: T42, F42
- Event(s): sprint, long jump, shot put, javelin throw
- Club: 1 LAV Rostock
- Coached by: Peter Schorling
Medal record
Track and field
Representing Germany
Paralympic Games
Bronze medal – third place	2012 London	100m – T42
World Championships
Gold medal – first place	2013 Lyon	Shot put – T42/44
Silver medal – second place	2011 Christchurch	100m – T42
Silver medal – second place	2013 Lyon	100m – T42
Silver medal – second place	2013 Lyon	Long jump – T42
Bronze medal – third place	2015 Doha	Long jump – T42
European Championships
Bronze medal – third place	2014 Swansea	Long jump – T42
Bronze medal – third place	2014 Swansea	100m – T42

Jana Schmidt (born 13 December 1972) is a Paralympian athlete from Germany competing mainly in category T42 track and field events.

== Athletics career ==
Schmidt first represented Germany at a Summer Paralympics in 2008 at Beijing, where she competed in the javelin throw and shot put. It would take her another four years to achieve a Paralympic podium finish, when she won a bronze medal in 100 metres sprint at the 2012 Summer Paralympics in London. As well as her Paralympic success, Schmidt has won medals at World and European Championships. At the World Championships she has performed the uncommon feat of medaling in a running, jumping and throwing event, with her best finish being the gold medal in the shot put at the 2013 World Championships in Lyon.
