= Mariia Bogacheva =

Russian Paralympic athlete (born 1977)

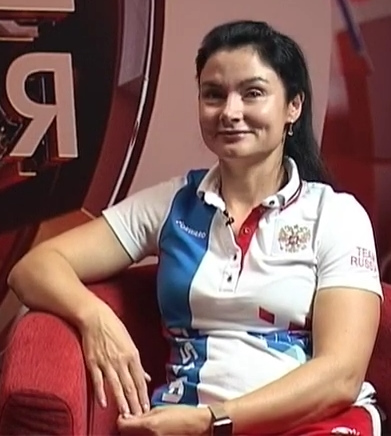
- Bogacheva in 2019

Personal information
- Born: 26 April 1977 (age 49)

Sport
- Country: Russia
- Sport: Para-athletics
- Disability class: F54
- Events: Javelin throw; Shot put
Medal record
Women's para-athletics
Representing Russia
World Championships
Gold medal – first place	2013 Lyon	Shot put F54
Silver medal – second place	2015 Doha	Shot put F54
Silver medal – second place	2019 Dubai	Shot put F54
European Championships
Gold medal – first place	2014 Swansea	Javelin throw F54
Gold medal – first place	2014 Swansea	Shot put F53/54/55
Gold medal – first place	2016 Grosseto	Javelin throw F54
Gold medal – first place	2016 Grosseto	Shot put F53/F54
Gold medal – first place	2021 Bydgoszcz	Javelin throw F54
Silver medal – second place	2021 Bydgoszcz	Shot put F54

Mariia Bogacheva (Russian: Мария Богачева; born 26 April 1977) is a Russian Paralympic athlete competing in F54-classification javelin throw and shot put events. She is a gold medalist and a two-time silver medalist in the women's shot put F54 event at the World Para Athletics Championships. She also won six medals, including five golds, at the World Para Athletics European Championships.

She won the silver medal in the women's shot put F54 event at the 2019 World Para Athletics Championships held in Dubai, United Arab Emirates.

She competed at the 2020 Summer Paralympics in Tokyo, Japan.
