= Marie-Amélie Le Fur =

French Paralympic athlete

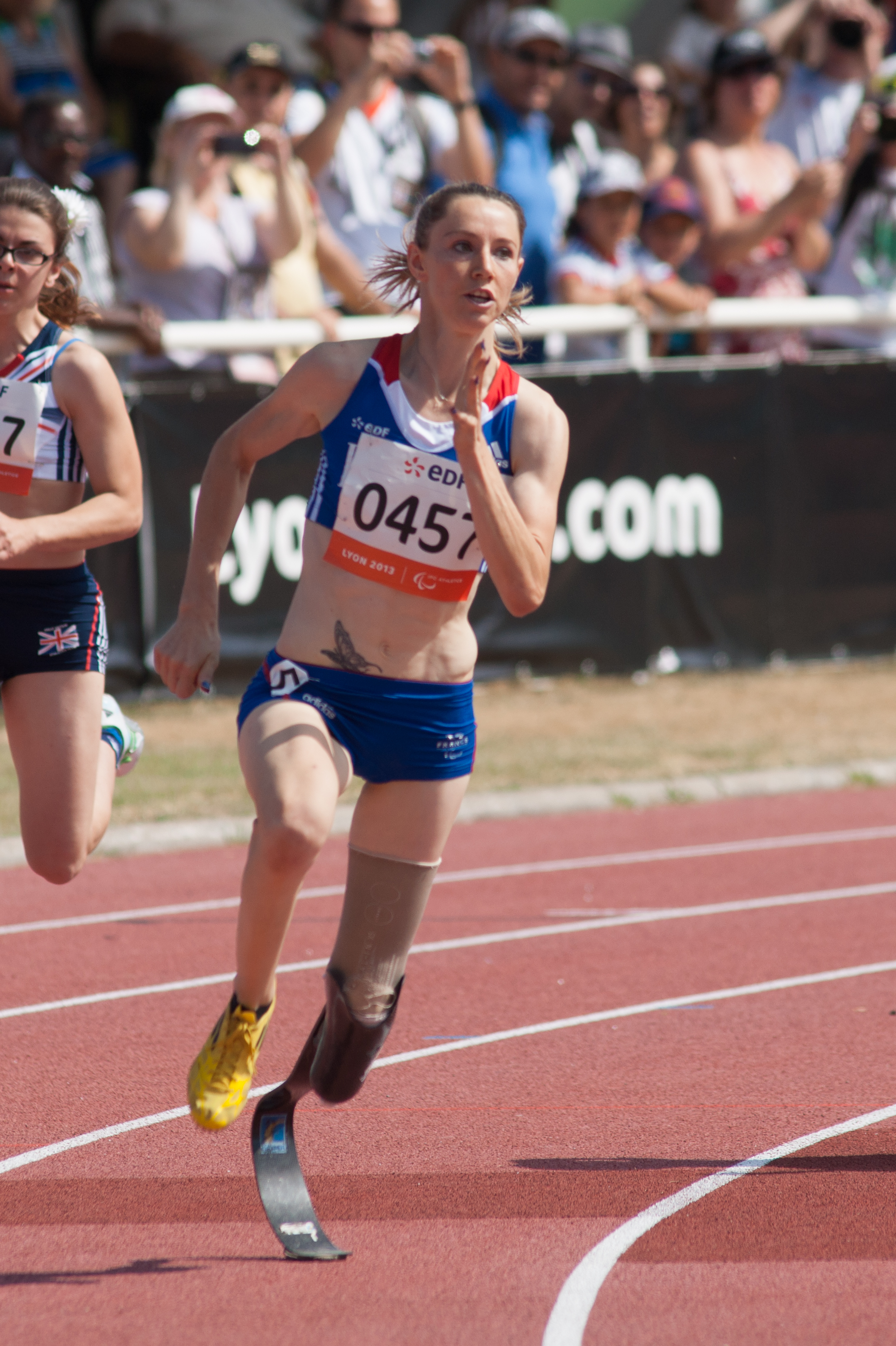
- Le Fur at the 2013 IPC Athletics Championship

Personal information
- Born: 26 September 1988 (age 37) Vendôme, Loir-et-Cher, Centre, France

Sport
- Country: France
- Sport: Paralympic athletics
Medal record
Women's track and field (T44)
Representing France
Paralympic Games
Gold medal – first place	2012 London	100 m – T44
Gold medal – first place	2016 Rio de Janeiro	400 m – T44
Gold medal – first place	2016 Rio de Janeiro	Long jump – T44
Silver medal – second place	2008 Beijing	Long jump – F44
Silver medal – second place	2008 Beijing	100 m – T44
Silver medal – second place	2012 London	200 m – T44
Silver medal – second place	2020 Tokyo	Long jump – T64
Bronze medal – third place	2012 London	Long jump – F42/44
Silver medal – second place	2016 Rio de Janeiro	200 m – T44
World Championships
Gold medal – first place	2011 Christchurch	100 m – T44
Gold medal – first place	2011 Christchurch	200 m – T44
Gold medal – first place	2015 Doha	400 m – T44
Gold medal – first place	2015 Doha	Long jump – T44
Silver medal – second place	2013 Lyon	100 m – T44
Silver medal – second place	2013 Lyon	200 m – T44
Silver medal – second place	2013 Lyon	Long jump – T44
Silver medal – second place	2015 Doha	200 m – T44
European Championships
Gold medal – first place	2014 Swansea	400 m – T44
Gold medal – first place	2016 Grosseto	400 m – T44
Silver medal – second place	2014 Swansea	Long jump – T44
Bronze medal – third place	2016 Grosseto	Long jump – T42–44

Marie-Amélie Le Fur (French pronunciation: [maʁi ameli lə fyʁ]; born 26 September 1988) is a French Paralympic athlete from Vendôme, Centre Region, competing in T44 sprint and F44 long jump events. Her left leg was amputated below the knee following a motor scooter accident in 2004. Before she lost her leg, she was a French junior running champion. As of 2023, Le Fur is the President of the French Paralympic and Sports Committee.

Le Fur competed in the 2008 Summer Paralympics in Beijing, China. There she won a silver medal in the women's Long jump – F44 event, a silver medal in the women's 100 metres – T44 event, and finished eighth in the women's 200 metres – T44 event.

Le Fur won gold in the T44 100m in London 2012 in a photo-finish, just ahead of the Netherlands' Marlou van Rhijn and the USA's April Holmes. She won silver in the T44 200m, behind T43 athlete Marlou van Rhijn, but in a new T44 world record time.

In the 2016 Summer Paralympic Games in Rio de Janeiro, Brazil, Le Fur captured gold medals in both the long jump T44 and the 400 metres T44 events, both with world records. She also won a bronze medal in the 200 metre T44 event.

She also represented France at the 2020 Summer Paralympics in Tokyo, Japan. She won the silver medal in the women's long jump T64 event.
