= 2016 IPC Athletics European Championships – Women's javelin throw =

The women's javelin at the 2016 IPC Athletics European Championships was held at the Stadio Olimpico Carlo Zecchini in Grosseto from 11 to 16 June.

== Medalists ==
Event	Gold		Silver		Bronze	
F11-F13	Anna Kulinich-Sorokina (F12); Russia	40.33; 904 pts	Natalija Eder (F12); Russia	36.22; 788 pts	—	
F34	Marjaana Heikkinen; Finland	17.87	Frances Herrmann; Germany	17.39	Lucyna Kornobys; Poland	16.81
F37	Irina Vertinskaya; Russia	26.28	Svetlana Sergeeva; Russia	25.96	—	
F54	Mariia Bogacheva; Russia	15.16 CR	Yuliya Nezhura; Belarus	10.65	—	
F56	Martina Willing; Germany	22.05 SB	Diana Dadzite (F55); Latvia	20.29 CR	Daniela Todorova (F55); Bulgaria	18.80
WR world record | AR area record | CR championship record | GR games record | NR national record | OR Olympic record | PB personal best | SB season best | WL world leading (in a given season)

== See also ==
- List of IPC world records in athletics
