= 2014 IPC Athletics European Championships – Women's discus throw =

The women's discus throw at the 2014 IPC Athletics European Championships was held at the Swansea University Stadium from 18 to 23 August.

== Medalists ==
Event	Gold		Silver		Bronze	
F11/12	Assunta Legnante (F11); Italy	29.91; 1068 pts	Sofia Oksem (F12); Russia	45.97 WR; 1048 pts	Marija Iveković (F12); Croatia	39.66; 923 pts
F38	Viktorya Yasevych (T37); Ukraine	28.69	Irina Vertinskaya (T37); Russia	28.35	Ingrīda Priede (T38); Latvia	27.63
F55	Marianne Buggenhagen; Germany	24.62	Daniela Todorova; Bulgaria	16.43	Solmaz Safarova; Azerbaijan	16.32
F57	Stela Eneva; Bulgaria	31.88	Orla Barry; Ireland	28.13	Ilke Wyludda; Germany	27.87

== See also ==
- List of IPC world records in athletics
