= Josie Pearson =

British Paralympic wheelchair rugby player

Josie Pearson MBE
Personal information
- Nationality: British
- Born: 3 January 1986 (age 40) Bristol, England

Sport
- Country: England, Great Britain
- Sport: Athletics
- Event(s): Wheelchair rugby Discus; Club
- Club: Disability Sport Wales, Cardiff
- Coached by: Anthony Hughes

Achievements and titles
- Paralympic finals: 2008, 2012
- Personal best(s): Discus: 7.09m Club: 14.60m
Medal record
Track and field (athletics)
Representing Great Britain
Paralympic Games
Gold medal – first place	2012 London	Discus – F51
IPC World Championships
Gold medal – first place	2013 Lyon	Discus – F51/52/53
Silver medal – second place	2013 Lyon	Club throw – F31/32/51
IPC European Championships
Silver medal – second place	2014 Swansea	Club throw – T32/51

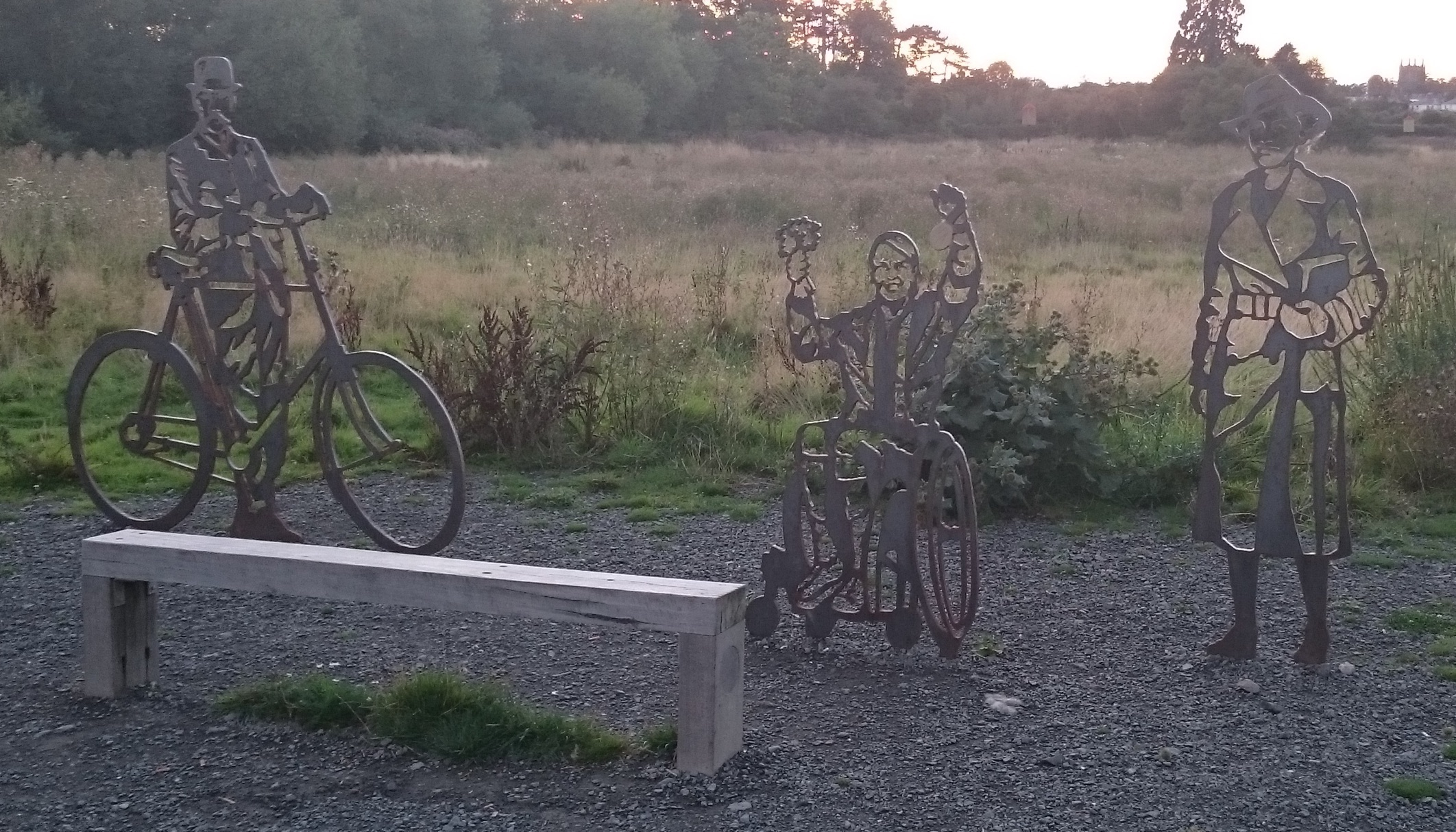
Portrait bench alongside Hereford Greenway depicting Violette Szabo GC, Josie Pearson MBE and Sir Edward Elgar

Josie Rachel Pearson MBE (born 3 January 1986) is a Paralympian wheelchair rugby player and athlete from England. Pearson represented Great Britain in the 2008 Summer Paralympics, becoming the first women to compete in wheelchair rugby for her country at the Paralympics. After competing as a sprint athlete, Pearson switched to throwing events and qualified for the 2012 Summer Paralympics in both discus and club throw in the F51 class, eventually taking the gold in discus with a world record distance.

== Career history ==
Pearson was born in Bristol in 1986 to Philip and Sue. The younger of two daughters, Pearson grew up in the village of Brilley, Herefordshire. She later moved to Hay-on-Wye on the Welsh border, where her mother runs a fashion and lifestyle shop with Josie's older sister Freya (b. 1977). A keen show jumper, she was involved in a head-on car collision near Goytre in Wales in May 2003. The accident, in which her boyfriend died, resulted in Pearson breaking two bones in her neck and permanent spinal damage. Her legs were paralysed but she retained some use of her arms.

While Pearson at first wished to continue riding, her injuries made that course difficult. She continued her sporting endeavours and along with appearing in a dressage exhibition in 2005, she also trained as a wheelchair racer in 100, 200 and 400m events. She began wheelchair rugby while studying neuroscience at Cardiff University, and while there she contacted the local club, Cardiff Pirates. Accepted into the team, she decided to leave university after a year to concentrate on making the Paralympic squad, a goal she had followed since watching the Athens Games. In November 2006 she was selected to represent Great Britain at the 2008 Summer Paralympics. The team finished just outside the medals, after losing to Canada in the bronze medal decider.

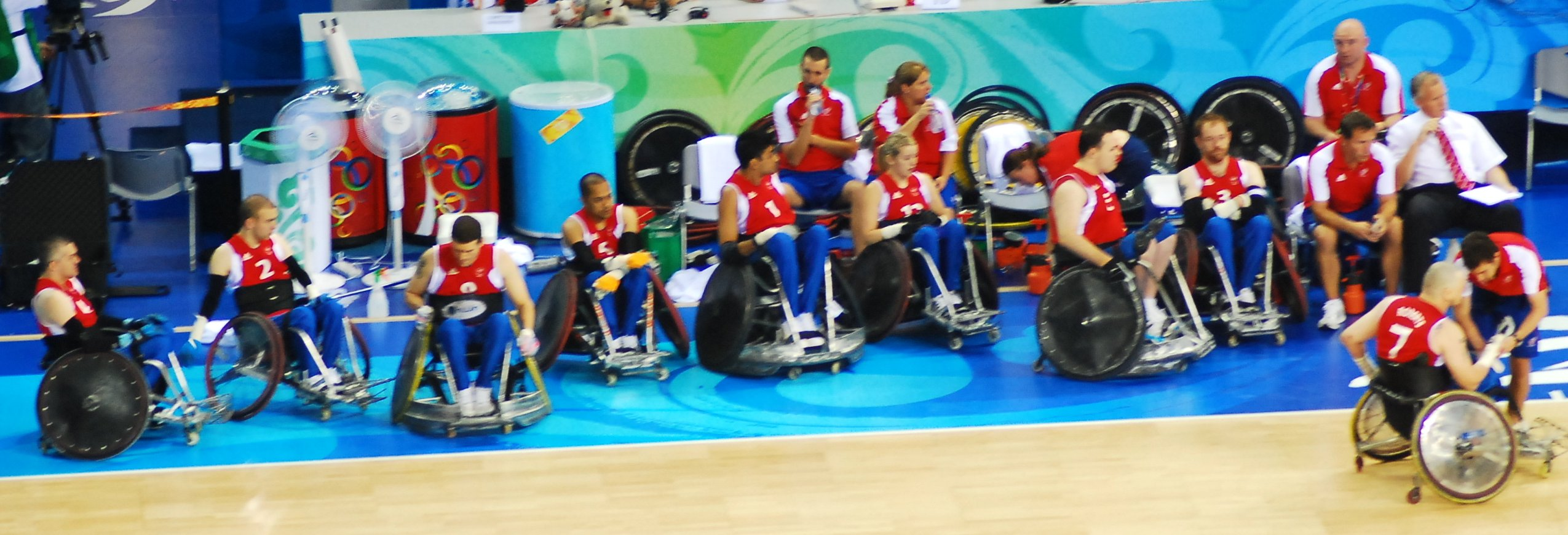
Pearson with the GB team at the 2008 Paralympics

In 2011 at the IPC Athletics World Championships in New Zealand she finished 5th in both the 100m and 800m events and was disqualified in both the 200m and 400m races. Frustrated by her performance, Pearson decided to leave wheelchair racing and switched to throwing events. She took up discus and the club throw, and in 2011 came first in the F51 discus in the Czech Open with a distance of 4.42 and second in the F51 club throw, recording 8.81m. In 2012, she improved on her personal bests, throwing 12.81m in the club and a world record of 6.66m in the F51 discus. These results were enough to qualify for the 2012 Summer Paralympics in both events.

On 7 September 2012, Pearson won gold at the 2012 Paralympic Games, breaking the F51 discus world record in the process. As part of the Olympic and Paralympic home-nation celebrations, the Royal Mail issued a stamp of each of the gold winning medalists, as well as painting a post-box in their home town gold. Pearson chose Hay-on-Wye as the location for her golden post-box. Pearson was appointed Member of the Order of the British Empire (MBE) in the 2013 New Year Honours for services to athletics.

In 2013 Pearson qualified for the discus and club throw as part of the British team for the 2013 IPC Athletics World Championships in Lyon, France. In the discus Pearson threw a distance of 7.09m, setting a new world record and securing the gold medal. Four days later she recorded a personal best in the club throw, and secured the bronze medal.

In 2014, Pearson won silver in the club throw at the IPC European Championships in a GB & NI one, two, three (Jo Butterfield, Josie Pearson, Gemma Prescott).

After a restructuring to the Paralympic programme in the run-up to the 2016 Summer Paralympics, in April 2015 it was announced that Pearson had joined British Cycling's Paralympic Podium Programme in order to compete in handcycling.
