= 2014 IPC Athletics European Championships – Women's 5000 metres =

The women's 5000 metres at the 2014 IPC Athletics European Championships was held at the Swansea University Stadium from 18–23 August. Only a final event was contested; no heats events were contested.

== Medalists ==
Event	Gold		Silver		Bronze	
T54	Manuela Schaer; Switzerland	13:20.04	Gunilla Wallengren; Sweden	13:56.22	Jade Jones; Great Britain	13:56.66

== Results ==
=== T54 ===
Final

Rank	Sport Class	Name	Nationality	Time	Notes
1st place, gold medalist(s)	T54	Manuela Schaer	Switzerland	13:20.04	
2nd place, silver medalist(s)	T54	Gunilla Wallengren	Sweden	13:56.22	
3rd place, bronze medalist(s)	T54	Jade Jones	Great Britain	13:56.66	
4	T54	Patricia Keller	Switzerland	13:57.01	
5	T54	Shelly Woods	Great Britain	13:57.58	

== See also ==
- List of IPC world records in athletics
