= Athletics at the 2008 Summer Paralympics – Women's 100 metres T38 =

The Women's 100m T38 had its competition held on September 9 with the First Round at 10:50 and the Final at 18:00.

== Medalists ==
Gold	Inna Stryzhak; Ukraine
Silver	Sonia Mansour; Tunisia
Bronze	Margarita Goncharova; Russia

== Results ==
Place	Athlete	First Round	Final
1	Inna Stryzhak (UKR)	13.56 Q WR	13.43 WR
2	Sonia Mansour (TUN)	13.65 Q PR	13.66
3	Margarita Goncharova (RUS)	14.29 Q	13.97
4	Jenifer Santos (BRA)	14.69 Q	14.31
5	Tamira Slaby (GER)	14.47 q	14.75
6	Katsiaryna Kirushchanka (BLR)	14.79 q	14.79
7	Anezka Vejrazkova (CZE)	14.87 Q	14.81
8	Katy Parrish (AUS)	14.31 Q	DNS
9	Kirrilee McPherson (AUS)	15.29	
10	Aikaterini Michou (GRE)	16.24	
