= 2013 IPC Athletics World Championships – Women's 100 metres =

The women's 100 metres at the 2013 IPC Athletics World Championships was held at the Stade du Rhône from 20–29 July.

== Medalists ==
Class	Gold	Silver	Bronze
T11	Terezinha Guilhermina; Brazil	Jerusa Santos; Brazil	Jhulia Dos Santos; Brazil
T12	Zhou Guohua; China	Libby Clegg; United Kingdom	Oxana Boturchuk; Ukraine
T13	Olena Gliebova; Ukraine	Ilse Hayes; South Africa	Sanaa Benhama; Morocco
T34	Hannah Cockroft; United Kingdom	Amy Siemons; Netherlands	Rosemary Little; Australia
T35	Oxana Corso; Italy	Virginia McLachlan; Canada	Liu Ping; China
T36	Claudia Nicoleitzik; Germany	Jeon Min-Jae; South Korea	Aygyul Sakhibzadaeva; Russia
T37	Mandy Francois-Elie; France	Maria Seifert; Germany	Johanna Benson; Namibia
T38	Sophie Hahn; United Kingdom	Verônica Hipólito; Brazil	Chen Junfei; China
T42	Martina Caironi; Italy	Jana Schmidt; Germany	Vanessa Low; Germany
T44	Marlou van Rhijn; Netherlands	Marie-Amélie Le Fur; France	April Holmes; United States
T46	Yunidis Castillo; Cuba	Nikol Rodomakina; Russia	Alicja Fiodorow; Poland
T52	Michelle Stilwell; Canada	Cassie Mitchell; United States	Kerry Morgan; United States
T53	Huang Lisha; China	Angela Ballard; Australia	Ilana Dupont; Canada
T54	Tatyana McFadden; United States	Amanda Kotaja; Finland	Georgina Oliver; United Kingdom

== See also ==
- List of IPC world records in athletics
