= Daniela Todorova =

Bulgarian Paralympic athlete

Medal record

Paralympic athletics

Representing Bulgaria

Paralympic Games
Bronze medal – third place	2008 Beijing	Javelin Throw - F54-56

IPC World Championships
Bronze medal – third place	2015 Doha	javelin - F56

IPC European Championships
Silver medal – second place	2014 Swansea	Discus - F55
Silver medal – second place	2014 Swansea	Javelin - F56
Bronze medal – third place	2016 Grosseto	Shot put - F55
Bronze medal – third place	2016 Grosseto	Javelin - T56

Daniela Todorova Todorova (Bulgarian: Даниела Тодорова Тодорова; born 18 October 1980, in Kazanlak) is a Paralympian athlete from Bulgaria competing mainly in category F54-56 javelin throw, discus throw and shot put events.

She competed in the 2008 Summer Paralympics in Beijing, China. There she won a bronze medal in the women's F54-56 javelin throw event.
