= 2014 IPC Athletics European Championships – Men's triple jump =

The men's triple jump at the 2014 IPC Athletics European Championships was held at the Swansea University Stadium from 18–23 August.

== Medalists ==
Event	Gold		Silver		Bronze	
T47	Georgios Kostakis; Greece	13.78	Aliaksandr Subota; Belarus	13.63	Christos Koutoulias; Greece	13.05

== Results ==
Rank	Sport Class	Name	Nationality	Result	Notes
1st place, gold medalist(s)	T46	Georgios Kostakis	Greece	13.78	
2nd place, silver medalist(s)	T46	Aliaksandr Subota	Belarus	13.63	
3rd place, bronze medalist(s)	T47	Christos Koutoulias	Greece	13.05	
4	T47	Simonas Kurutis	Lithuania	12.92	
5	T47	Daniel Perez Martinez	Spain	12.60	
6	T47	Numan Cam	Turkey	10.59	
7	T47	Kerim Elyaz	Turkey	10.19	

== See also ==
- List of IPC world records in athletics
