= 2014 IPC Athletics European Championships – Men's 4 × 100 metres relay =

The men's 4 × 100 metres relay at the 2014 IPC Athletics European Championships was held at the Swansea University Stadium from 18–23 August.

== Medalists ==
Event	Gold		Silver		Bronze	
T11-13	Russia; Artem Loginov; Alexey Labzin; Fedor Trikolich; Andrey Koptev	43.03	France; Antoine Perel; Gauthier Tresor Makunda; Bacou Dambakate; Timothee Adolphe	45.89	Spain; Gerard Desgarrega Puigdevall; Joan Munar Martinez; Martin Parejo Maza; Diego Sancho Villanueva	46.45

== Results ==
Rank	Nation	Time	Notes
1st place, gold medalist(s)	Russia	43.03	
2nd place, silver medalist(s)	France	45.89	SB
3rd place, bronze medalist(s)	Spain	46.45	
4	Turkey	47.37	

== See also ==
- List of IPC world records in athletics
