= 2016 IPC Athletics European Championships – Women's shot put =

The women's shot put at the 2016 IPC Athletics European Championships was held at the Stadio Olimpico Carlo Zecchini in Grosseto from 11–16 June.

== Medalists ==
| Event | Gold | | Silver | | Bronze | |
|---|---|---|---|---|---|---|
| F12 | Sofia Oksem; Russia | 13.68 WR | Tamara Sivakova; Belarus | 11.98 SB | — | |
| F20 | Ewa Durska; Poland | 14.10 WR | Antonina Baranova; Russia | 13.36 | Ines Fernandes; Portugal | 12.35 PB |
| F32/F33 | Svetlana Krivenok (F33); Russia | 5.75; 875 pts | Anthi Liagkou (F33); Greece | 4.89 SB; 655 pts | Noemi Szigeti (F32); Hungary | 3.66; 215 pts |
| F34 | Lucyna Kornobys; Poland | 8.33 PB | Elena Orlova; Russia | 6.81 | Frances Herrmann; Germany | 6.78 |
| F35/36 | Birgit Kober (F36); Germany | 11.20 WR; 1020 pts | Galina Lipatnikova (F36); Russia | 9.34 PB; 826 pts | Juliane Mogge (F36); Germany | 9.19 PB; 805 pts |
| F37 | Franziska Liebhardt; Germany | 13.62 CR | Irina Vertinskaya; Russia | 12.50 PB | — | |
| F40/F41 | Renata Śliwińska (F40); Poland | 6.32 PB; 672 pts | Marijana Goranovic (F41); Montenegro | 6.93 PB; 535 pts | Uliana Podpalnaya (F40); Russia | 4.99 PB; 336 pts |
| F53/F54 | Mariia Bogacheva (F54); Russia | 7.14 CR; 938 pts | Dimitra Korokida (F53); Greece | 4.27 CR; 870 pts | Deirdre Mongan (F53); Ireland | 4.23; 859 pts |
| F55 | Diana Dadzite; Latvia | 8.12 PB | Marianne Buggenhagen; Germany | 7.45 SB | Daniela Todorova; Bulgaria | 6.90 |
| F57 | Ivanka Koleva; Bulgaria | 8.50 SB | Martina Willing (F56); Germany | 7.89 | Miroslava Obrova; Czech Republic | 6.23 |
WR world record | AR area record | CR championship record | GR games record | NR national record | OR Olympic record | PB personal best | SB season best | WL world leading (in a given season)

== See also ==
- List of IPC world records in athletics
