= Svetlana Krivenok =

Russian Paralympic athlete (born 1998)

Personal information
- Nationality: Russian
- Born: 19 March 1998 (age 28) Bryansk, Russia

Sport
- Sport: Para-athletics
- Disability class: F33
- Event: shot put
Medal record
Women's para-athletics
Representing Neutral Paralympic Athletes
Paralympic Games
Bronze medal – third place	2024 Paris	Shot put F33
World Championships
Gold medal – first place	2025 New Delhi	Shot put F33
Bronze medal – third place	2024 Kobe	Shot put F33
Representing Russia
World Championships
Gold medal – first place	2015 Doha	Shot put F33
Silver medal – second place	2019 Dubai	Shot put F33
European Championships
Gold medal – first place	2016 Grosseto	Shot put F32/F33

Svetlana Krivenok (born 2 July 1988) is a Russian para-athlete specializing in shot put.

== Career ==
In May 2024, Krivenok competed at the 2024 World Para Athletics Championships and won a bronze medal in the shot put F33 event. She then represented Neutral Paralympic Athletes at the 2024 Summer Paralympics and won a bronze medal in the shot put F33 event.
