= Dimitra Korokida =

Greek Paralympic athlete

Sport
- Country: Greece
- Sport: Para-athletics
- Disability: Paraplegia
- Disability class: F53
- Events: Javelin throw; Shot put
Medal record
Representing Greece
Women's Athletics
Paralympic Games
Bronze medal – third place	2016 Rio de Janeiro	Shot put F53
World Championships
Gold medal – first place	2015 Doha	Shot put F53
Silver medal – second place	2013 Lyon	Javelin throw F52/F53
European Championships
Silver medal – second place	2016 Grosseto	Shot put F53/F54
Women's Taekwondo
European Championships
Gold medal – first place	2025 Tallinn	Poomsae, P51

Dimitra Korokida is a Greek Paralympic athlete. She represented Greece at the 2016 Summer Paralympics in Rio de Janeiro, Brazil and she won the bronze medal in the women's shot put F53 event.

She won the silver medal in the women's javelin throw F52/F53 event at the 2013 World Championships held in Lyon, France. Two years later, she won the gold medal in the women's shot put F53 event at the 2015 World Championships held in Doha, Qatar.

She also competed at the 2016 European Championships held in Grosseto, Italy winning the silver medal in the women's shot put F53/F54 event.

She was awarded as the Best Greek female athlete with a disability for 2015 and 2016.
