= 2014 IPC Athletics European Championships – Women's club throw =

The women's club throw at the 2014 IPC Athletics European Championships was held at the Swansea University Stadium from 18–23 August.

== Medalists ==
Event	Gold		Silver		Bronze	
F32/51	Joanna Butterfield (F51); Great Britain	17.68 ER; 1110 pts	Josie Pearson (F51); Great Britain	14.02; 941 pts	Gemma Prescott (F32); Great Britain	20.39; 905 pts

== See also ==
- List of IPC world records in athletics
