= 2014 IPC Athletics European Championships – Women's javelin throw =

The women's javelin throw at the 2014 IPC Athletics European Championships was held at the Swansea University Stadium from 18–23 August.

== Medalists ==
Event	Gold		Silver		Bronze	
F12	Anna Sorokina; Russia	40.67	Natalija Eder; Austria	36.45	Marija Vidacek; Croatia	32.99
F34	Birgit Kober; Germany	19.56	Lucyna Kornobys; Poland	16.32	Marjaana Heikkinen; Finland	16.21
F37	Svetlana Sergeeva; Russia	24.01	Irina Vertinskaya; Russia	22.83	Eva Berná; Croatia	20.52
F54	Maria Bogacheva (F54); Russia	14.34	Svitlana Stetsyuk (F53); Ukraine	10.50 ER	—	
F56	Martina Willing (F56); Germany	20.71	Daniela Todorova (F55); Bulgaria	17.82	Marianne Buggenhagen (F55); Germany	16.35

== See also ==
- List of IPC world records in athletics
