= Irina Vertinskaya =

Russian Paralympic athlete (born 1984)

Personal information
- Born: 17 September 1984 (age 41) Moscow, Russia, Soviet Union

Sport
- Sport: Para-athletics
- Disability class: F37
- Event(s): shot put discus throw javelin throw
Medal record
Women's para-athletics
Representing Neutral Paralympic Athletes
Paralympic Games
| Bronze medal – third place | 2024 Paris | Shot put F37 |
World Championships
| Silver medal – second place | 2024 Kobe | Shot put F37 |
Representing Russia
World Championships
| Bronze medal – third place | 2015 Doha | Shot put F37 |
| Bronze medal – third place | 2019 Dubai | Shot put F37 |
European Championships
| Gold medal – first place | 2016 Grosseto | Javelin throw F37 |
| Silver medal – second place | 2014 Swansea | Discus throw F38 |
| Silver medal – second place | 2014 Swansea | Javelin throw F37 |
| Silver medal – second place | 2016 Grosseto | Shot put F37 |
| Bronze medal – third place | 2014 Swansea | Shot put F37 |
| Bronze medal – third place | 2016 Grosseto | Discus throw F38 |

Irina Vertinskaya (born 17 September 1984) is a Russian para-athlete, competing in throwing events: shot put, discus throw and javelin throw. She represented Neutral Paralympic Athletes at the 2024 Summer Paralympics

== Career ==
Vertinskaya competed at the 2024 World Para Athletics Championships and won a silver medal in the shot put F37 event. She then represented Neutral Paralympic Athletes at the 2024 Summer Paralympics and won a bronze medal in the shot put F37 event.
