= Inna Stryzhak =

Ukrainian Paralympic athlete

Personal information
- Born: 11 June 1985 (age 41) Dnepropetrovsk, Ukraine
- Height: 167 cm (66 in)

Sport
- Country: Ukraine
- Sport: Athletics
- Disability class: T38
- Event: sprint
- Club: Invasport: Dnipropetrovsk
- Coached by: Iryna Slyusar
Medal record
Event	1st	2nd	3rd
Paralympic Games	2	1	4
World Championships	6	0	2
European Championships	1	1	1
(Track and field)
Representing Ukraine
Paralympic Games
Gold medal – first place	2008 Beijing	100m - T38
Gold medal – first place	2008 Beijing	200m - T38
Silver medal – second place	2012 London	Long jump - T38
Bronze medal – third place	2000 Sydney	100m - T38
Bronze medal – third place	2004 Athens	400m - T38
Bronze medal – third place	2012 London	100m - T38
Bronze medal – third place	2012 London	200m - T38
IPC World Championships
Gold medal – first place	2006 Lille	100m - T38
Gold medal – first place	2002 Lille	400m - T38
Gold medal – first place	2006 Assen	100m - T38
Gold medal – first place	2006 Assen	200m - T38
Gold medal – first place	2011 Christchurch	100m - T38
Gold medal – first place	2011 Christchurch	100m relay – T35-38
Bronze medal – third place	2011 Christchurch	200m - T38
Bronze medal – third place	2015 Doha	Long jump - T38
IPC European Championships
Gold medal – first place	2012 Stadskanaal	Long jump - T38
Silver medal – second place	2014 Swansea	Long jump - T38
Bronze medal – third place	2014 Swansea	400m - T38

Inna Stryzhak (Ukrainian: Інна Стрижак), in some instances referred to as Inna Stryzhak-Dyachenko (née Dyachenko; born 11 June 1985) is a Paralympian athlete from Ukraine competing mainly in category T38 sprint events.

Stryzhak competed in her first Paralympics at the 2000 Games in Sydney, Australia. There she won a bronze medal in the women's 100 metres - T38 event and finished fourth in the women's 200 metres - T38 event. She was back in the Ukrainian team for the 2004 Summer Paralympics in Athens, Greece, adding a second bronze medal, this time in the women's 400 metres (T38). Stryzhak followed this with her most successful Games to date, winning two gold medals at the 2008 Summer Paralympics in Beijing, China. The first was in the women's 100 metres and the second in the women's 200 metres. Her fourth consecutive Games was London 2012 adding two more bronze medals in the 100m and 200m sprints and a silver in her new event, the long jump.
