= Frederike Koleiski =

German Paralympic athlete

Personal information
- Full name: Frederike Charlotte Koleiski
- Born: 25 August 1987 (age 38) Wesel, West Germany
- Height: 1.79 m (5 ft 10 in)

Sport
- Country: Germany
- Sport: Paralympic athletics
- Disability: Hemiplegia; Polyneuropathy
- Disability class: T44
- Club: Eintracht Duisburg
Medal record
Paralympic athletics
Representing Germany
World Championships
Gold medal – first place	2017 London	Shot put F44
Bronze medal – third place	2015 Doha	Shot put F44

Frederike Charlotte Koleiski (born 25 August 1987) is a German Paralympic athlete who competes in discus throw and shot put in international elite competitions. She is a World champion in shot put and narrowly missed a medal at the 2016 Summer Paralympics.
