= Margarita Goncharova =

Russian Paralympic athlete

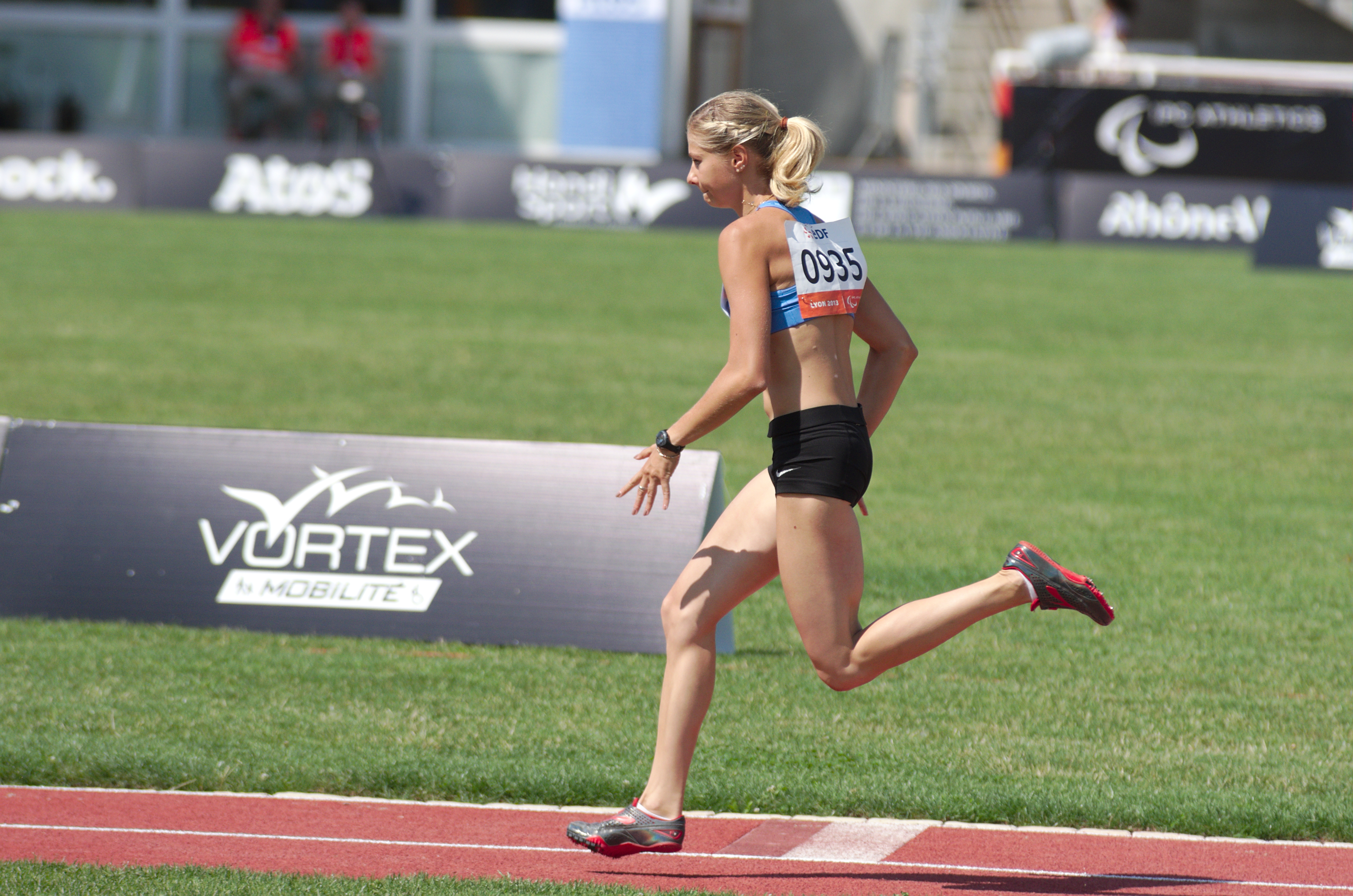

Medal record

Track and field (T38)

Representing Russia

Paralympic Games
Gold medal – first place	2012 London	Long Jump F37/38
Gold medal – first place	2012 London	100m - T38
Gold medal – first place	2012 London	4 x 100m relay T35/T38
Silver medal – second place	2012 London	200m - T38
Bronze medal – third place	2008 Beijing	100m - T38
Bronze medal – third place	2008 Beijing	200m - T38

World Championships
Gold medal – first place	2015 Doha	200m - T38
Gold medal – first place	2015 Doha	400m - T38
Gold medal – first place	2015 Doha	long jump - T38
Gold medal – first place	2015 Doha	4x100m relay - T35-38
Silver medal – second place	2019 Dubai	Long jump - T38
Bronze medal – third place	2015 Doha	100m - T38

European Championships
Gold medal – first place	2012 Stadskanaal	100m - T38
Gold medal – first place	2012 Stadskanaal	200m - T38
Gold medal – first place	2012 Stadskanaal	4x100m relay- T35-38
Gold medal – first place	2014 Swansea	100m - T38
Gold medal – first place	2014 Swansea	400m - T38
Gold medal – first place	2014 Swansea	Long jump - T38
Gold medal – first place	2014 Swansea	4x100m - T35-38
Silver medal – second place	2012 Stadskanaal	Long jump - T38
Gold medal – first place	2016 Grosseto	200m - T38
Gold medal – first place	2016 Grosseto	Long jump - T38
Silver medal – second place	2016 Grosseto	400m - T38

Representing Neutral Paralympic Athletes (NPA)

World Championships
Silver medal – second place	2024 Kobe	Long jump - T38
Bronze medal – third place	2024 Kobe	400 m - T38

Margarita Goncharova (Russian: Маргарита Александровна Гончарова; née Koptilova Russian: Коптилова; born March 14, 1991, in Volsk, Saratov oblast) is a Paralympian athlete from Russia competing mainly in category T38 sprint events.

== Career ==
She competed in the 2008 Summer Paralympics in Beijing, China. There she won a bronze medal in the women's 100 metres - T38 event and a bronze medal in the women's 200 metres - T38 event.
