= Georgina Oliver =

Personal information
- Nationality: United Kingdom
- Born: 26 August 1992 (age 33)

Sport
- Country: Great Britain
- Sport: Athletics
- Event: T54 sprint
- Club: Leeds City
- Coached by: Pete Wyman

Achievements and titles
- Personal best(s): 100m sprint: 17.28s: 17.08s (w); 200m sprint: 31.35s
Medal record
Women's athletics
Representing Great Britain
IPC World Championships
Bronze medal – third place	2013 Lyon	100m - T54

Georgina Oliver (born 26 August 1992) is a parasport track and field athlete from England competing in T54 sprint events. In 2013, she qualified for the 2013 IPC Athletics World Championships, selected for the T54 100 m and 200 m, taking bronze in the former. Oliver has spina bifida.

== Career history ==
Oliver, from Rastrick in Yorkshire, came to prominence as a sprint and mid-distance racer in 2009, medalling in several national race events. Her first major result came in the 2009 BWRA (British Wheelchair Racing Association) Championships in Gateshead when she won bronze in the 100m sprint and 400m race, at the age of sixteen. The following year she record two more podium finishes with another two third places, in the 100m and 200m sprints, at the 2010 BWRA Championship. She improved her results in the 2013 Championships with silver in both the 100m and 200m events.

2012 was a disappointing year for Oliver, as with hopes of qualifying for the 2012 Summer Paralympics in London, she failed to record a successful qualifying time at the Paralympic World Cup. Despite posting a personal best at the Daniela Jutzeler Memorial in Switzerland earlier in the year she was unable to replicate the result at the 2012 BWRA Championships where she took gold in the 400m, but failed to medal in her favoured 100m and 200m sprint events.

The 2013 season saw an improvement in Oliver's results when, at the BWRA Championships, she took gold in the 100m and 200m sprints and in the 400m and 800m. This saw her qualify for the British team for the 2013 IPC Athletics World Championships in Lyon, competing in both the 100m and 200m sprints. At Lyon she qualified for the final of the 200m after finishing third in the heats with a personal best of 31.38s. In the final she finished seventh. Oliver fared better in the 100m, qualifying for the 100m final when she finished third recording a time of 17.93s. In the final she initially finished fourth, recording a personal best of 17.28s, but she was promoted to third place, winning the bronze medal after China's Liu Wenjun was disqualified. Her success in 2013 saw Oliver selected by British Athletics as an athlete with World Cup Podium Potential, ensuring funding for future events.
