= Olena Rozdobudko =

Ukrainian athlete

Olena Mykhailivna Rozdobudko (born 28 July 1989) is a Ukrainian athlete. Master of Sports of Ukraine of international class. Participant of the 2016 Summer Paralympic Games. Participant of the 2018 European Athletics Championships.

Rozdobudko has set multiple records in long jumps: 2012 Paralympic games record (6.00 m), 2013 World and Europe records (6.09 m), 2014 record of Ukraine (5.57 m). Rozdobudko is engaged in athletics at the Zaporizhia Regional Center for Physical Culture and Sports for the Disabled "Invasport."

Rozdobudko's coaches are Oksana Morozova and Viktor Derkach.

== Achievements ==
- Bronze medalist of the 2014 European Championship.
- Bronze medalist of the 2015 World Cup.
- Silver medalist (triple jump) of the 2016 World Cup.
