= Elvina Vidot =

French Paralympic athlete

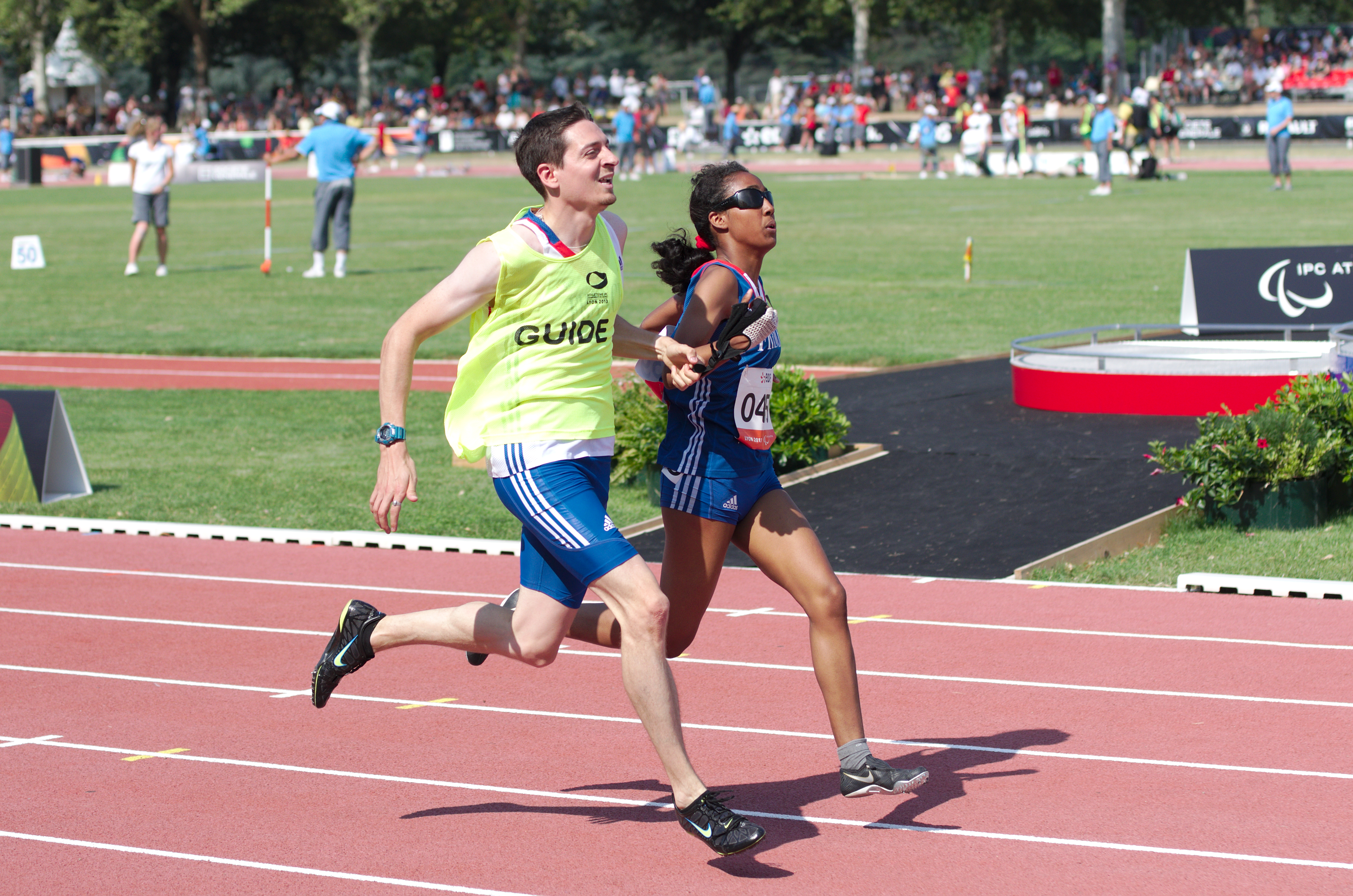
- Elvina Vidot and Loic Scouarnec of France during the Women's 200m - T11 first semifinal

Personal information
- Born: 25 November 1993 (age 32) Réunion

Sport
- Country: France
- Sport: Paralympic athletics
- Disability: Glaucoma
- Disability class: T11
- Event(s): 100 metres 200 metres Long jump
- Club: AVIA CLUB Issy les Moulineaux
- Coached by: Jo MAISETTI; Sylvie TALMAN
Medal record
Paralympic athletics
Representing France
European Championships
Silver medal – second place	2014 Swansea	Women's 100m T11

Elvina Vidot (born 25 November 1993) is a blind French Paralympic athlete who competes in sprinting and long jump events in international level events.
