= Arjola Dedaj =

Italian Paralympic athlete (born 1981)

Personal information
- Nicknames: Arj, Duracell
- Born: 26 November 1981 (age 44) Tirana, Albania
- Height: 1.67 m (5 ft 6 in)

Sport
- Country: Italy
- Sport: Paralympic athletics
- Disability: Retinitis pigmentosa
- Disability class: T11
- Events: 100 metres 200 metres Long jump
- Club: Fiamme Azzurre
- Partner: Emanuele Di Marino
Medal record
Women's para-athletics
Representing Italy
World Championships
| Gold medal – first place | 2017 London | Long jump T11 |
| Bronze medal – third place | 2025 New Delhi | Long jump T11 |
European Championships
| Silver medal – second place | 2014 Swansea | 200m T11 |
| Silver medal – second place | 2014 Swansea | Long jump T11 |
| Bronze medal – third place | 2014 Swansea | 100m T11 |
| Bronze medal – third place | 2016 Grosseto | 200m T11 |
| Bronze medal – third place | 2016 Grosseto | Long jump T11 |

Arjola Dedaj (born 26 November 1981 in Tirana, Albania) is a blind Italian para-athlete who competes in sprinting and long jump events in international level events.

== Personal life ==
Dedaj was born in Albania, she was discriminated by her visual impairment which she has had since the age of three years old because there were no schools in Albania that could provide her an education. She immigrated to Italy in a rubber dinghy in 1998 along with her father and brother to join her mother who was in Milan.

She and her partner Emanuele Di Marino, who is her training partner and also participates in Paralympic track and field events are referred to as "La coppia dei sogni" ("the dream couple" in Italian).
