= Anna Sapozhnikova =

Russian Paralympic athlete

Personal information
- Nationality: Russian
- Born: 26 July 1997 (age 28) Chelyabinsk, Russia

Sport
- Sport: Para-athletics
- Disability class: T37
- Event: Long jump
- Club: Chelyabinsk Adaptive Sports School
- Coached by: Viktor Slobodchikov; Elena Malchikova
Medal record
Women's para-athletics
Representing RPC
Paralympic Games
Bronze medal – third place	2020 Tokyo	Long jump T37

Anna Sapozhnikova (born 26 July 1997) is a Russian Paralympic athlete who represented Russian Paralympic Committee athletes at the 2020 Summer Paralympics in the women's long jump T37 event and won a bronze medal.
