= 2014 IPC Athletics European Championships =

Sports event

IPC Athletics European Championships
- Host city: Swansea, Wales, United Kingdom
- Nations: 37
- Athletes: 550
- Events: 193
- Dates: 18 – 23 August
- Main venue: Swansea University

The 2014 IPC Athletics European Championships was a track and field competition for athletes with a disability open to International Paralympic Committee (IPC) affiliated countries within Europe, plus Azerbaijan and Israel. It was held in Swansea, Wales, United Kingdom and lasted from 18 to 23 August. The competition was staged at Swansea University Stadium. Approximately 550 athletes from 37 countries attended the games.

Russia won the Games atop the medal table with 41 Gold medals, and also collected the greatest overall medal haul with 88. The host nation, Britain, finished third. Of the 37 competing nations, 34 managed to achieve a podium finish. There were seven world records set and a further seven European records, in a games that was beset by difficult weather conditions throughout the tournament.

== Venue ==

The venue for the Championships was the Swansea University athletics stadium.

== Format ==
The 2014 IPC Athletics European Championships is an invitational tournament taking in track and field events. No combined sports were included in the 2014 Championships. Not all events were open to all classifications, though no events were contested between classifications.

Athletes finishing in first place are awarded the gold medal, second place the silver medal and third place the bronze. If only three competitors are available to challenge for an event then no bronze medal is awarded. Some events will be classed as 'no medal' events.

== Coverage ==
As with the 2013 IPC Athletics World Championships, the IPC produced live streaming footage of the Championships on ParalympicSport.TV. In the United Kingdom Channel 4 continued their commitment to para-sport with their own live streaming website and daily live coverage shown on their sister channel More4.

== Events ==
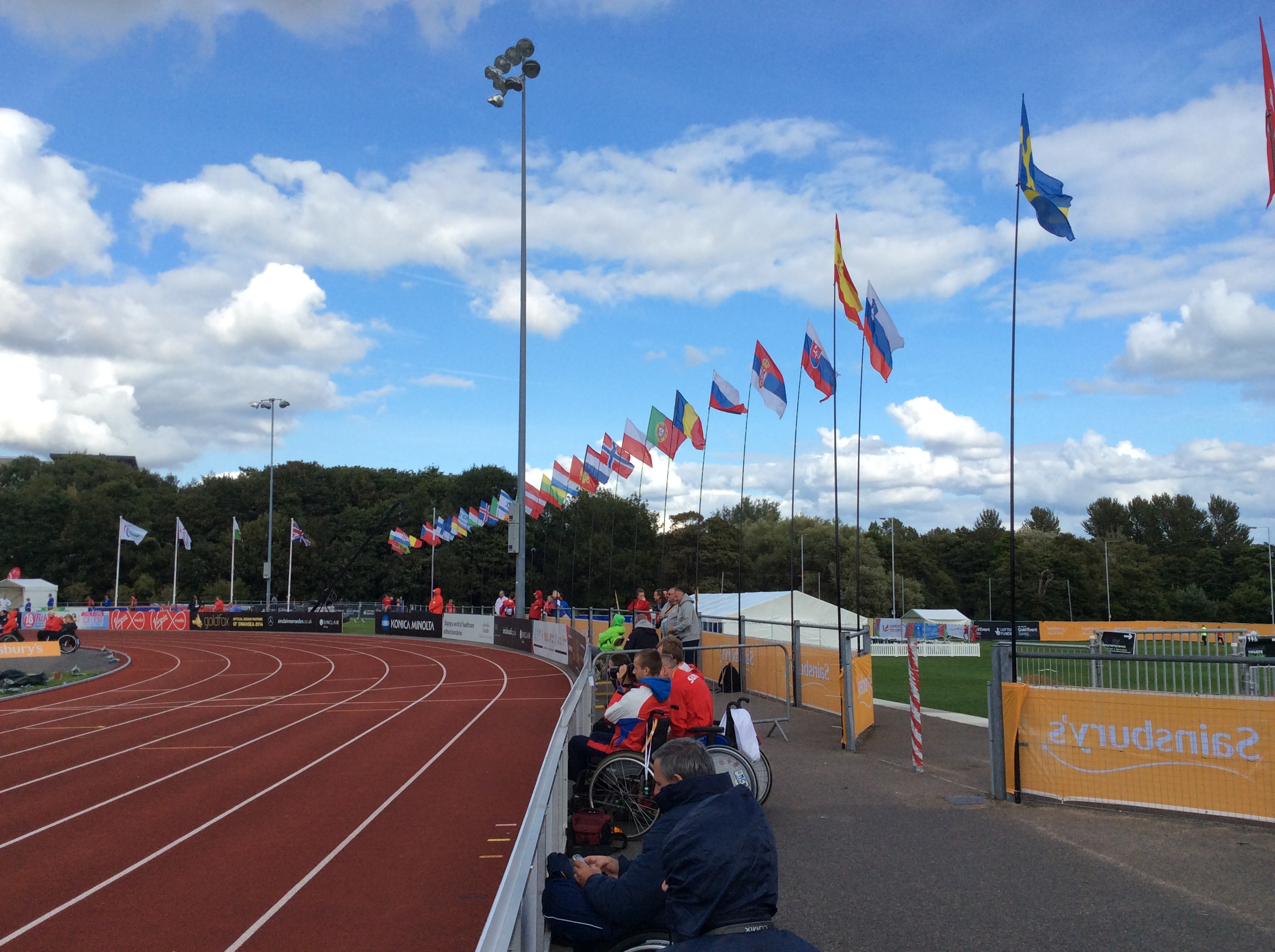
The flags of the competing nations at the 2014 Championships.

=== Opening ceremony ===
The Championship opening ceremony took place at the Swansea University Stadium on the night of 18 August the day before the first events were held. The competition was officially opened by Welsh Assembly Minister John Griffiths followed by an address by the IPC president Sir Philip Craven.

The IPC flag carried into the stadium by schoolgirl Molly Hopkins, the youngest Swansea 2014 ambassador, Paralympian champion John Harris, swimmer Jack Thomas and games volunteer Harmony Dumay; before it was raised to signal the opening of the games. The swearing of the oaths were undertaken by Welsh athlete Josie Pearson, her coach Anthony Hughes, and on behalf of the officials by Matt Witt.

Entertainment was provided at the venue by singers Shaheen Jafargholi and John Adams; and the Morriston Orpheus Choir.

=== Classification ===
To ensure competition is as fair and balanced as possible, athletes are classified dependent on how their disability impacts on their chosen event/s. Thus athletes may compete in an event against competitors with a different disability to themselves. Where there are more than one classification in one event, (for example discus throw F54/55/56), a points system is used to determine the winner.

- F = field athletes
- T = track athletes
- 11-13 – visually impaired, 11 and 12 compete with a sighted guide
- 20 – intellectual disability
- 31-38 – cerebral palsy or other conditions that affect muscle co-ordination and control. Athletes in class 31-34 compete in a seated position; athletes in class 35-38 compete standing.
- 41-46 – amputation, les autres
- 51-58 – wheelchair athletes

=== Schedule ===
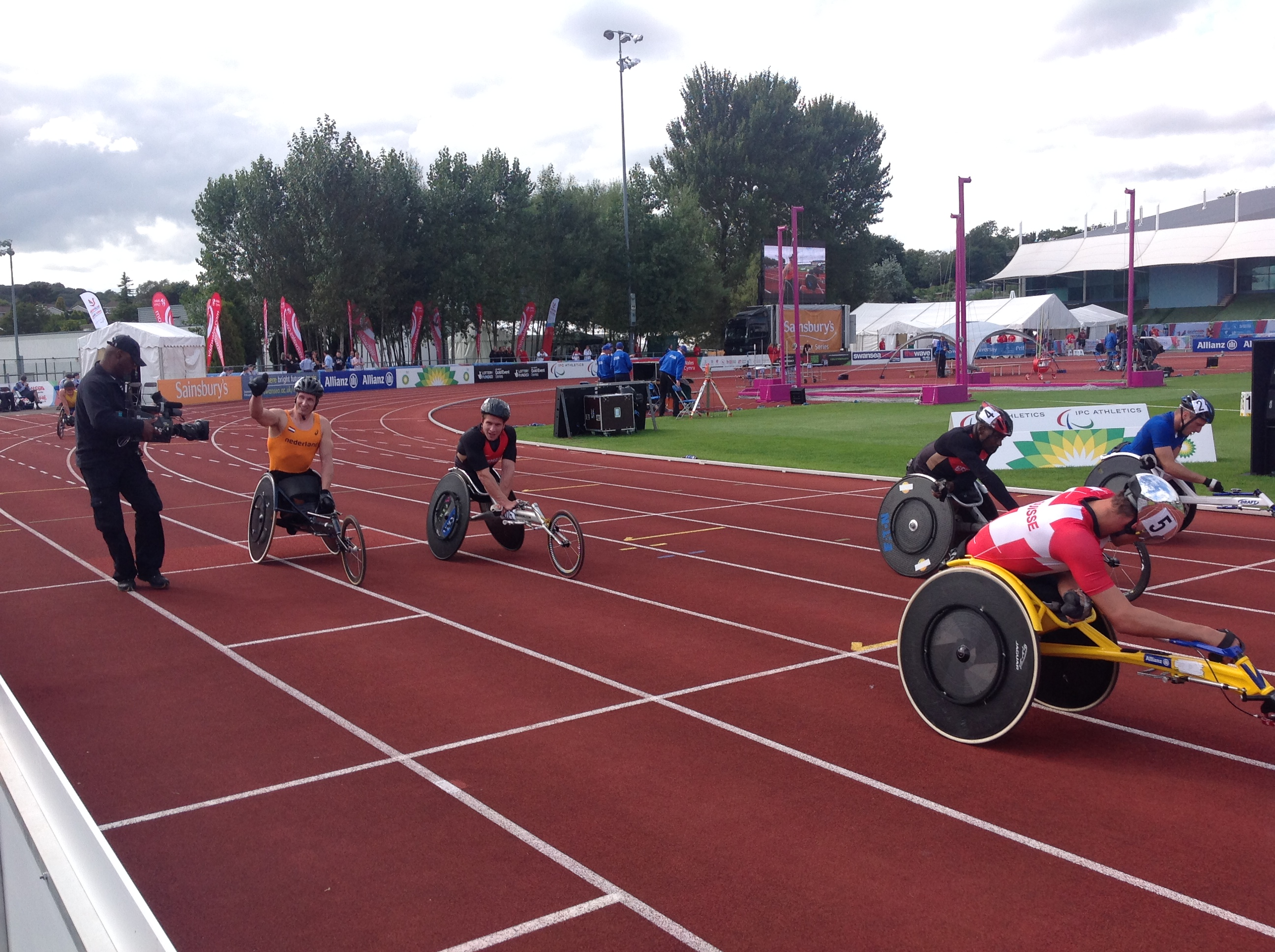
The final of the men's T54 400m sprint. The Netherlands' Kenny van Weeghel celebrates the gold medal during the victory lap.

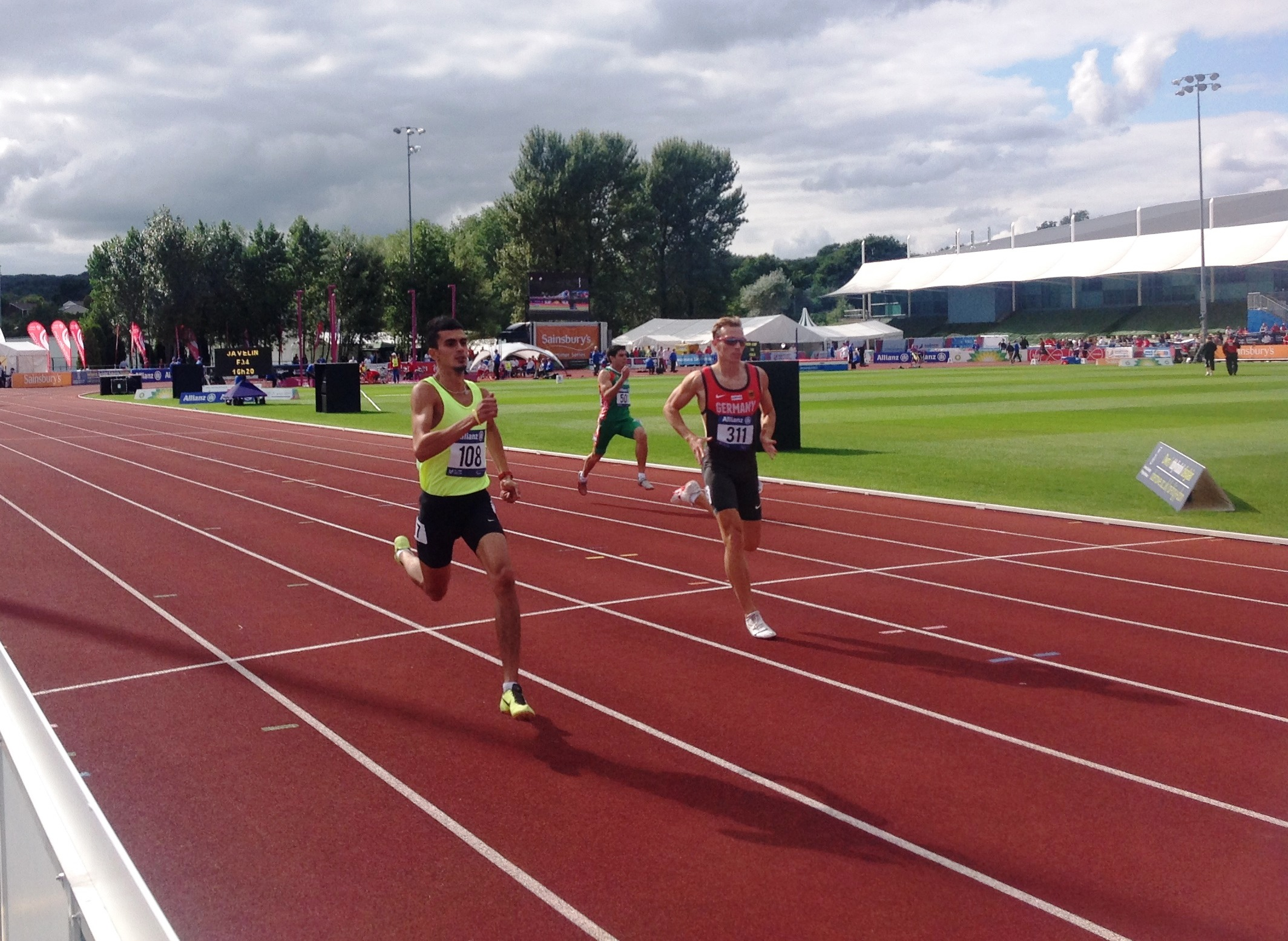
The final of the men's T12 400m sprint. Germany's Thomas Ulbricht wins gold, here challenged by Elmir Jabrayilov

●	Opening ceremony	Events	●	Closing ceremony

Date →		18	19	20	21	22	23
100 m	Men; Details		T12; T42; T44; T35; T36; T37; T38; T34; T54	T33; T53; T51; T13; T11	T47		
100 m	Women; Details		T42; T44; T37; T34; T51; T53	T13; T54; T47; T38; T35; T12; T11	T36	T33; T52	
200 m	Men; Details			T47; T44	T11; T12; T13; T35; T36; T37; T38; T42; T34; T53	T54	
200 m	Women; Details		T36		T12; T35; T44	T11	
400 m	Men; Details		T51	T44; T36; T54; T52; T12		T53; T37; T38; T47; T13; T20	T11; T34
400 m	Women; Details		T13; T53; T47; T54	T20; T52		T44; T37; T38; T12	T11
800 m	Men; Details		T53	T38; T34; T36	T54		
800 m	Women; Details				T53; T54	T34	
1500 m	Men; Details		T52	T54		T20	T38; T46; T11
1500 m	Women; Details			T11		T13	T46; T13; T20; T54
5000 m	Men; Details			T13		T11	T54
5000 m	Women; Details			T54			
4 × 100 m relay	Men; Details						T11-13
4 × 100 m relay	Women; Details						T35-38
Long jump	Men; Details		T11	T47; T12; T37	T20	T36; T13	T38; T44; T42
Long jump	Women; Details		T38; T11	T12	T37; T20; T42	T47; T44	
High jump	Men; Details		T12	T42	T47	T44	
Triple jump	Men; Details		T47				
Shot put	Men; Details		F20; F38; F57	F44; F32	F34; F42; F36; F35	F33; F12; F46	F55; F40; F37; F53; F41
Shot put	Women; Details		F37; F32; F35	F20; F40; F55	F12	F36; F57; F41	F33; F53; F34
Discus throw	Men; Details		F12; F34	F56; F38	F52; F11	F44	F57; F46; F42
Discus throw	Women; Details		F55; F40; F52; F41		F57	F11; F12; F44	F38
Javelin throw	Men; Details		F46; F42	F57; F34; F41	F44; F38; F56	F40; F54	F12
Javelin throw	Women; Details		F12		F56; F46; F37	F34; F54	
Club throw	Men; Details		F32	F51			
Club throw	Women; Details			F51		F32	
Ceremonies		●					●

== Medal table ==
The end medal table after day 5, showing all medal winning countries.

* Host nation (Great Britain)

Rank	Nation	Gold	Silver	Bronze	Total
1	Russia	41	29	18	88
2	Ukraine	17	8	18	43
3	Great Britain*	16	19	17	52
4	Germany	14	17	15	46
5	Finland	9	3	4	16
6	France	8	8	4	20
7	Switzerland	8	3	6	17
8	Poland	6	15	10	31
9	Spain	6	9	10	25
10	Netherlands	5	4	5	14
11	Italy	4	5	2	11
12	Bulgaria	4	3	4	11
13	Turkey	4	3	2	9
14	Ireland	4	1	0	5
15	Sweden	3	2	2	7
16	Greece	2	5	5	12
17	Austria	2	2	0	4
18	Croatia	2	1	5	8
18	Czech Republic	2	1	5	8
20	Lithuania	2	1	2	5
21	Belarus	2	1	1	4
22	Latvia	2	0	1	3
23	Portugal	1	6	3	10
24	Azerbaijan	1	2	1	4
24	Hungary	1	2	1	4
26	Slovakia	1	1	1	3
27	Iceland	1	0	1	2
28	Serbia	0	5	1	6
29	Denmark	0	2	1	3
30	Belgium	0	2	0	2
31	Luxembourg	0	1	0	1
31	Norway	0	1	0	1
33	Slovenia	0	0	1	1
Totals (33 entries)		168	162	146	476

=== Multiple medallists ===
Many competitors won multiple medals at the 2014 Championships. The following athletes won four medals or more.

Name	Country	Medal	Event
Margarita Goncharova	Russia	Gold; Gold; Gold; Gold	100m - T38; 400m - T38; Long jump - T38; 4 × 100 m relay - T35-38
Henry Manni	Finland	Gold; Gold; Gold; Gold	100m - T34; 200m - T34; 400m - T34; 800m - T34
Manuela Schär	Switzerland	Gold; Gold; Gold; Gold	400m - T54; 800m - T54; 1500m - T54; 5000m - T54
Marcel Hug	Switzerland	Gold; Gold; Gold; Bronze	800m - T54; 1500m - T54; 5000m - T54; 400m - T54
Kenny van Weeghel	Netherlands	Gold; Gold; Silver; Silver	200m - T54; 400m - T54; 100m - T54; 800m - T54
Marc Schuh	Germany	Silver; Bronze; Bronze; Bronze	400m - T54; 100m - T54; 200m - T54; 800m - T54

== Highlights ==
=== Broken records ===
Fourteen records were broken including seven world records.

Event	Round	Name	Nation	Time/Distance	Date	Record
Men's 400m T37	Final	Andrei Vdovin	Russia	50.91	22 August	WR
Men's 5000m T13	Final	Alexey Akhtyamov	Russia	15:07.13	20 August	ER
Men's High Jump T44	Final	Maciej Lepiato	Poland	2.17m	22 August	WR
Men's Discus Throw F44	Final	Dan Greaves	Great Britain	62.34m	22 August	ER
Men's Discus Throw F54	Final	Drazenko Mitrovic	Serbia	33.68	20 August	WR
Women's 100m T12	Semifinal	Oxana Boturchuk	Ukraine	12.00	19 August	ER
Women's 400m T38	Final	Margarita Goncharova	Russia	1:03.40	22 August	WR
Women's 400m T44	Final	Marie-Amelie Le Fur	France	1:01.41	22 August	WR
Women's 4 × 100 m Relay T35-38	Final	Zhanna Fekolina; Margarita Goncharova; Anna Sapozhnikova; Svetlana Sergeeva	Russia	53.53	23 August	WR
Women's Long Jump T37	Final	Anna Sapozhnikova	Russia	4.46	21 August	ER
Women's Shot Put F37	Final	Eva Berna	Czech Republic	11.01	19 August	ER
Women's Discus Throw F12	Final	Sofia Oksem	Russia	45.97	22 August	WR
Women's Javelin Throw F53	Final	Svitlana Stetsyuk	Ukraine	10.50	22 August	ER
Women's Club Throw F51	Final	Joanna Butterfield	Great Britain	17.68	22 August	ER

== Participating nations ==
Below is the list of countries who agreed to participate in the Championships and the requested number of athlete places for each.

- Austria 6
- Azerbaijan 5
- Belarus 6
- Belgium 5
- Bulgaria 10
- Croatia 15
- Denmark 7
- Estonia 2
- Finland 11
- France 19
- Germany 32
- Great Britain 52
- Greece 35
- Hungary 7
- Ireland 8
- Iceland 3
- Israel 2
- Italy 13
- Latvia 8
- Lithuania 11
- Luxembourg 1
- Montenegro 1
- Norway 4
- Netherlands 23
- Poland 33
- Portugal 22
- Romania 3
- Russia 74
- Serbia 9
- Slovakia 5
- Slovenia 2
- Spain 31
- Sweden 8
- Switzerland 9
- Czech Republic 12
- Turkey 24
- Ukraine 34

== See also ==
- 2014 European Athletics Championships

== Footnotes ==
Notes
