= Athletics at the 2016 Summer Paralympics – Women's 5000 metres =

Paralympics athletic event

The Women's 5000m athletics event for the 2016 Summer Paralympics took place at the Estádio Olímpico João Havelange from September 14 to September 15, 2016. A single event was contested over this distance for the T54 classifications.

== Schedule ==
R	Round 1	½	Semifinals	F	Final

Event↓/Date →	Thu 8	Fri 9	Sat 10	Sun 11	Mon 12	Tue 13	Wed 14	Thu 15	Fri 16	Sat 17
T54 5000m							R	F		

== Medal summary ==
Classification	Gold		Silver		Bronze	
T54	Tatyana McFadden; United States	11:54.07	Chelsea McClammer; United States	11:54.33	Amanda McGrory; United States	11:54.34

=== T54 ===
Rank	Athlete	Country	Time	Notes
1st place, gold medalist(s)	Tatyana McFadden	United States	11:54.07	
2nd place, silver medalist(s)	Chelsea McClammer	United States	11:54.33	
3rd place, bronze medalist(s)	Amanda McGrory	United States	11:54.34	
4	Madison de Rozario	Australia	11.54.46	
5	Zou Lihong	China	11.55.10	
6	Ma Jing	China	11.57.20	SB
7	Diane Roy	Canada	11:58.78	
8	Manuela Schaer	Switzerland	11:59.86	
9	Maria de Fátima Fonseca Chaves	Brazil	12:06.15	PB
10	Gunilla Wallengren	Sweden	12:20.15	
			Temperature: 25 C	
