= Athletics at the 2016 Summer Paralympics – Women's marathon =

The women's marathon athletics events for the 2016 Summer Paralympics took place in the streets of Rio de Janeiro on the 18 September. A total of two events were contested over this distance for three different disability classifications.

== Results ==
=== T12 ===
The T12 women's marathon was open to both T12 and T11 competitors, which are classifications for visually impaired athletes.

Rank	Name	Nationality	classification	Time	Notes
1st place, gold medalist(s)	Elena Congost; Guide: Roger Esteve Montserrat	Spain	T12	3:01.43	PB
2nd place, silver medalist(s)	Misato Michishita	Japan	T12	3:06.52	
3rd place, bronze medalist(s)	Edneusa Dorta	Brazil	T12	3:18.38	
4	Zheng Jin	China	T11	3:19.46	WR
5	Hiroko Kondo	Japan	T12	3:23.12	
-	Mihoko Nishijima	Japan	T12	Did not finish	
-	Maria del Carmen Paredes Rodriguez; Guide: Lorenzo Sanchez Martin	Spain	T12	Did not finish	

=== T54 ===
The T54 women's marathon was open to T54, T53 and T52 competitors.

Rank	Name	Nationality	classification	Time	Notes
1st place, gold medalist(s)	Zou Lihong	China	T54	1:38.44	PR RR
2nd place, silver medalist(s)	Tatyana McFadden	United States	T54	1:38.44	PR RR
3rd place, bronze medalist(s)	Amanda McGrory	United States	T54	1:38.45	SB
4	Wakako Tsuchida	Japan	T54	1:38.45	SB
5	Shirley Reilly	United States	T53	1:38.46	SB
6	Manuela Schaer	Switzerland	T54	1:38.46	RR
7	Susannah Scaroni	United States	T54	1:38.47	PB
8	Sandra Graf	Switzerland	T54	1:38.52	SB
9	Christie Dawes	Australia	T53	1:42.59	RR
10	Aline Rocha	Brazil	T54	1:43.01	
11	Ma Jing	China	T54	1:51.48	SB
12	Alicia Ibarra Barajas	Mexico	T54	1:56.46	
-	Chelsea McClammer	United States	T53	Did not finish	
-	Maria de Fatima Fonseca Chaves	Brazil	T54	Did not finish	
