= Athletics at the 2016 Summer Paralympics – Women's 800 metres T53 =

Women's 800 metres T53 at the XV Paralympic Games
- Venue: Estádio Olímpico João Havelange
- Dates: heats_date–17 September 2016
- Competitors: 13 from 9 nations

Medalists
1st place, gold medalist(s)		Hongzhuan Zhou	China
2nd place, silver medalist(s)		Madison de Rozario	Australia
3rd place, bronze medalist(s)		Shirley Reilly	United States

The T53 category is for wheelchair athletes with normal use of arms and hands, no or limited trunk function, and no leg function.

The Athletics at the 2016 Summer Paralympics – Women's 800 metres T53 event at the 2016 Paralympic Games took place on heats_date–17 September 2016, at the Estádio Olímpico João Havelange.

== Heats ==
=== Heat 1 ===
10:16 17 September 2016:

Rank	Lane	Bib	Name	Nationality	Reaction	Time	Notes
1	3	904	Chelsea McClammer	United States		1:52.96	Q
2	7	162	Lisha Huang	China		1:53.76	Q
3	4	36	Madison de Rozario	Australia		1:54.14	Q
4	8	777	Catherine Debrunner	Switzerland		1:55.04	
5	5	472	Kazumi Nakayama	Japan		1:55.89	
6	6	140	Ilana Dupont	Canada		2:01.17	

=== Heat 2 ===
10:24 17 September 2016:

Rank	Lane	Bib	Name	Nationality	Reaction	Time	Notes
1	6	188	Hongzhuan Zhou	China		1:48.37	Q
2	7	30	Angela Ballard	Australia		1:48.74	Q
3	4	337	Samantha Kinghorn	Great Britain		1:48.89	Q
4	3	913	Shirley Reilly	United States		1:49.69	q
5	2	849	Hamide Kurt	Turkey		1:50.33	q
6	8	77	Jessica Cooper Lewis	Bermuda		1:58.24	
7	5	901	Kelsey Lefevour	United States		2:09.07	

== Final ==
17:46 17 September 2016:

Rank	Lane	Bib	Name	Nationality	Reaction	Time	Notes
1st place, gold medalist(s)	3	188	Hongzhuan Zhou	China		1:47.45	
2nd place, silver medalist(s)	2	36	Madison de Rozario	Australia		1:47.64	
3rd place, bronze medalist(s)	5	913	Shirley Reilly	United States		1:47.77	
4	4	30	Angela Ballard	Australia		1:47.97	
5	7	904	Chelsea McClammer	United States		1:48.32	
6	6	337	Samantha Kinghorn	Great Britain		1:49.51	
7	1	162	Lisha Huang	China		1:52.15	
8	8	849	Hamide Kurt	Turkey		1:52.78	
