= United States at the 2016 Summer Paralympics =

- Flag of the United States
- IPC code: USA
- NPC: United States Paralympic Committee
- Website: www.teamusa.org/US-Paralympics

in Rio de Janeiro
- Competitors: 289 in 20 sports
- Flag bearers: Allison Jones (opening), Josh Brunais (closing)
- Medals Ranked 4th: Gold 40 Silver 44 Bronze 31 Total 115

Summer Paralympics appearances (overview)
- 1960; 1964; 1968; 1972; 1976; 1980; 1984; 1988; 1992; 1996; 2000; 2004; 2008; 2012; 2016; 2020; 2024

The United States competed at the 2016 Summer Paralympics in Rio de Janeiro, Brazil, from 7 September to 18 September 2016. The first places the team qualified were for three athletes in sailing events. They also qualified athletes in archery, goalball, shooting, swimming, and wheelchair basketball.

== Team ==
The United States had a team of 267 sportspeople scheduled to compete in 20 different sports at the 2016 Games. The team was 17% larger than the one that compete at the 2012 Summer Paralympics. The USA qualified a team in each of the 8 different team sports at the Games, the first time this happened since the 2004 Summer Paralympics. Of the 267 sportspeople in Rio, 142 were participating at the Games another time, having already participated in a previous Games.

The United States delegation included thirty veterans. The team had three active service members. Forty-three states and Washington DC were represented in Rio. The state with the greatest number of representatives was California, with 29. Michigan and Washington both sent 14 athletes.

To generate interest in the Games, the USOC organized US Paralympics’ Road to Rio Tour. This 10 tour involved nine stops around the United States and officially got underway on July 4, 2015.

== Medalists ==
Medal	Name	Sport	Event
Gold	Andre Shelby	Archery	Men's individual compound open
Gold	David Brown	Athletics	Men's 100m T11
Gold	Gianfranco Iannotta	Athletics	Men's 100m T52
Gold	Raymond Martin	Athletics	Men's 400m T52
Gold	Michael Brannigan	Athletics	Men's 1500m T20
Gold	Raymond Martin	Athletics	Men's 1500m T52
Gold	Deja Young	Athletics	Women's 100m T47
Gold	Deja Young	Athletics	Women's 200m T47
Gold	Breanna Clark	Athletics	Women's 400m T20
Gold	Tatyana McFadden	Athletics	Women's 400m T54
Gold	Tatyana McFadden	Athletics	Women's 800m T54
Gold	Tatyana McFadden	Athletics	Women's 1500m T54
Gold	Tatyana McFadden	Athletics	Women's 5000m T54
Gold	Roderick Townsend-Roberts	Athletics	Men's long jump T47
Gold	Roderick Townsend-Roberts	Athletics	Men's high jump T47
Gold	David Blair	Athletics	Men's discus throw F44
Gold	Rachael Morrison	Athletics	Women's discus throw F52
Gold	Will Groulx	Cycling	Men's road race H2
Gold	Shawn Morelli	Cycling	Women's road time trial C4
Gold	Jamie Whitmore	Cycling	Women's road race C1-3
Gold	Shawn Morelli	Cycling	Women's individual pursuit C4
Gold	Allysa Seely	Paratriathlon	Women's PT2
Gold	Grace Norman	Paratriathlon	Women's PT4
Gold	Brad Snyder	Swimming	Men's 50m freestyle S11
Gold	Brad Snyder	Swimming	Men's 100m freestyle S11
Gold	Brad Snyder	Swimming	Men's 400m freestyle S11
Gold	Roy Perkins	Swimming	Men's 50m butterfly S5
Gold	McKenzie Coan	Swimming	Women's 50m freestyle S7
Gold	Michelle Konkoly	Swimming	Women's 50m freestyle S9
Gold	McKenzie Coan	Swimming	Women's 100m freestyle S7
Gold	Michelle Konkoly	Swimming	Women's 100m freestyle S9
Gold	McKenzie Coan	Swimming	Women's 400m freestyle S7
Gold	Rebecca Meyers	Swimming	Women's 400m freestyle S13
Gold	Elizabeth Marks	Swimming	Women's 100m breaststroke SB7
Gold	Rebecca Meyers	Swimming	Women's 100m butterfly S13
Gold	Jessica Long	Swimming	Women's 200m individual medley SM8
Gold	Rebecca Meyers	Swimming	Women's 200m individual medley SM13
Gold	Women's team	Volleyball	Women's tournament
Gold	Men's wheelchair basketball team	Wheelchair basketball	Men's tournament
Gold	Women's wheelchair basketball team	Wheelchair basketball	Women's tournament
Silver	Raymond Martin	Athletics	Men's 100m T52
Silver	Hunter Woodhall	Athletics	Men's 200m T44
Silver	Kerri Morgan	Athletics	Women's 100m T52
Silver	Tatyana McFadden	Athletics	Women's 100m T54
Silver	Alexa Halko	Athletics	Women's 400m T34
Silver	Chelsea McClammer	Athletics	Women's 400m T53
Silver	Cheri Madsen	Athletics	Women's 400m T54
Silver	Alexa Halko	Athletics	Women's 800m T34
Silver	Amanda McGrory	Athletics	Women's 1500m T54
Silver	Chelsea McClammer	Athletics	Women's 5000m T54
Silver	Tatyana McFadden	Athletics	Women's marathon T54
Silver	Lex Gillette	Athletics	Men's long jump T11
Silver	Sam Grewe	Athletics	Men's high jump T42
Silver	Scot Severn	Athletics	Men's shot put F53
Silver	Cassie Mitchell	Athletics	Women's discus throw F52
Silver	Will Groulx	Cycling	Men's road time trial H2
Silver	Ryan Boyle	Cycling	Men's road time trial T1-2
Silver	Alicia Dana	Cycling	Women's road time trial H1-3
Silver	Megan Fisher	Cycling	Women's road time trial C4
Silver	Jill Walsh	Cycling	Women's road time trial T1-2
Silver	Jill Walsh	Cycling	Women's road race T1-2
Silver	Will Groulx; William Lachenauer; Oscar Sanchez	Cycling	Mixed team relay H2-5
Silver	Joseph Berenyi	Cycling	Men's individual pursuit C3
Silver	Jamie Whitmore	Cycling	Women's individual pursuit C1-3
Silver	Joseph Hamilton; Andy Jenks; John Kusku; Tyler Merren; Matt Simpson; Daryl Walker	Goalball	Men's tournament
Silver	Hailey Danisewicz	Paratriathlon	Women's PT2
Silver	Zachary Burns; Danielle Hansen; Jennifer Sichel; Jaclyn Smith; Dorian Weber	Rowing	Mixed coxed four
Silver	Alphonsus Doerr; Hugh Freund; Bradley Kendell	Sailing	Sonar 3-person
Silver	Roy Perkins	Swimming	Men's 100m freestyle S5
Silver	Roy Perkins	Swimming	Men's 200m freestyle S5
Silver	Tharon Drake	Swimming	Men's 400m freestyle S11
Silver	Brad Snyder	Swimming	Men's 100m backstroke S11
Silver	Tharon Drake	Swimming	Men's 100m breaststroke SB11
Silver	Rudy Garcia-Tolson	Swimming	Men's 200m individual medley SM7
Silver	Cortney Jordan	Swimming	Women's 100m freestyle S7
Silver	Rebecca Meyers	Swimming	Women's 100m freestyle S13
Silver	Cortney Jordan	Swimming	Women's 400m freestyle S7
Silver	Jessica Long	Swimming	Women's 400m freestyle S8
Silver	Sophia Elizabeth Herzog	Swimming	Women's 100m breaststroke SB6
Silver	Jessica Long	Swimming	Women's 100m breaststroke SB7
Silver	Cortney Jordan	Swimming	Women's 50m butterfly S7
Silver	McKenzie Coan; Michelle Konkoly; Jessica Long; Elizabeth Smith	Swimming	Women's 4 × 100 m freestyle relay
Silver	Men's wheelchair rugby team	Wheelchair rugby	Men's tournament
Silver	Nicholas Taylor; David Wagner	Wheelchair tennis	Quad doubles
Bronze	Hunter Woodhall	Athletics	Men's 400m T44
Bronze	Gianfranco Iannotta	Athletics	Men's 400m T52
Bronze	Kym Crosby	Athletics	Women's 100m T13
Bronze	Alexa Halko	Athletics	Women's 100m T34
Bronze	Grace Norman	Athletics	Women's 400m T44
Bronze	Kerri Morgan	Athletics	Women's 400m T52
Bronze	Shirley Reilly	Athletics	Women's 800m T53
Bronze	Chelsea McClammer	Athletics	Women's 1500m T54
Bronze	Amanda McGrory	Athletics	Women's 5000m T54
Bronze	Amanda McGrory	Athletics	Women's marathon T54
Bronze	Brian Sheridan	Cycling	Men's road time trial H2
Bronze	Oscar Sanchez	Cycling	Men's road time trial H5
Bronze	Samantha Bosco	Cycling	Women's road time trial C5
Bronze	Megan Fisher	Cycling	Women's individual pursuit C4
Bronze	Samantha Bosco	Cycling	Women's individual pursuit C5
Bronze	Jen Armbruster; Lisa Czechowski; Amanda Dennis; Marybai Huking; Eliana Mason; Asya Miller	Goalball	Women's tournament
Bronze	Dartanyon Crockett	Judo	Men's -90kg
Bronze	Christella Garcia	Judo	Women's +70kg
Bronze	Melissa Stockwell	Paratriathlon	Women's PT2
Bronze	McKenna Dahl	Shooting	Mixed 10m air rifle prone SH2
Bronze	Roy Perkins	Swimming	Men's 50m freestyle S5
Bronze	Robert Griswold	Swimming	Men's 100m backstroke S8
Bronze	Tucker Dupree	Swimming	Men's 100m backstroke S12
Bronze	Jessica Long	Swimming	Women's 100m backstroke S8
Bronze	Hannah Aspden	Swimming	Women's 100m backstroke S9
Bronze	Colleen Young	Swimming	Women's 100m breaststroke SB13
Bronze	Jessica Long	Swimming	Women's 100m butterfly S8
Bronze	Cortney Jordan	Swimming	Women's 200m individual medley SM7
Bronze	Hannah Aspden; Michelle Konkoly; Elizabeth Marks; Elizabeth Smith	Swimming	Women's 4 × 100 m medley relay
Bronze	David Wagner	Wheelchair tennis	Quad singles

== Archery ==
The United States qualified eight archers for the Rio Games following their performance at the 2015 World Archery Para Championships.

=== Men ===
Athlete	Event	Ranking round		Round of 32	Round of 16	Quarterfinals	Semifinals	Finals	
Athlete	Event	Score	Seed	Opposition score	Opposition score	Opposition score	Opposition score	Opposition score	Rank
Jeff Fabry	Men's individual compound W1	596	11	Koo (KOR); L 126-140	Did not advance				
KJ Polish	Men's individual compound open	685	2	Halldorssonn (ISL); W 143-129	Hall (GBR); L 133-139	Did not advance			
Andre Shelby	Men's individual compound open	669	12	Rodriguez Gonzalez (ESP); W 143-131	McQueen (GBR); W 138-133	Muniz de Castro (BRA); W 142-141	Milne (AUS); W 139-138	Simonelli (ITA); W 144-143	1st place, gold medalist(s)
Matt Stutzman	Men's individual compound open	684	4	Alexis (ESP); W 142-129	Muniz de Castro (BRA); L 141-142	Did not advance			
Eric Bennett	Men's individual recurve open	622	7	Kostel (CZE); W 7-3	Tseng (TPE); W 6-4	Netsiri (THA); L 0-6	Did not advance		
Michael Lukow	Men's individual recurve open	577	23	Tseng (TPE); L 0-6	Did not advance				

=== Women ===
Athlete	Event	Ranking round		Round of 32	Round of 16	Quarterfinals	Semifinals	Finals	
Athlete	Event	Score	Seed	Opposition score	Opposition score	Opposition score	Opposition score	Opposition score	Rank
Lia Coryell	Women's individual compound W1	535	7	—N/a		Frith (GBR); L 115-134	Did not advance		
Samantha Tucker	Women's individual compound open	597	17	Rubio Larrion (ESP); L 124-133	Did not advance				

=== Teams ===
Athlete	Event	Ranking round		Round of 32	Round of 16	Quarterfinals	Semifinals	Finals	
Athlete	Event	Score	Seed	Opposition score	Opposition score	Opposition score	Opposition score	Opposition score	Rank
Jeff Fabry; Lia Coryell	Team compound W1	1131	3	—N/a		Spain (ESP); W 128-113	South Korea (KOR); L 125-137	Czech Republic (CZE); L 129-137	4
KJ Polish; Samantha Tucker	Team compound open	1282	9	—N/a	South Korea (KOR); L 146-147	Did not advance			

== Athletics ==
With 62 athletes and 4 guides, the US athletics delegation is the largest in the country's history. Roderick Townsend is a high jumper on the American team. He was the tallest member of the United States delegation at 200.66 centimetres (79.00 in). Grace Norman and Allysa Seely competed in both athletics and paratriathlon in Rio.

=== Men's track ===
Athlete	Events	Heat		Semifinal		Final	
Athlete	Events	Time	Rank	Time	Rank	Time	Rank
Michael Brannigan	1500m T20	—N/a				3:51.73	1st place, gold medalist(s)
David Brown	100m T11	11.35	5 Q	11.04	1 Q	10.99 PR	1st place, gold medalist(s)
David Brown	200m T11	23.45	7 Q	23.32	6	Did not advance	
David Brown	400m T11	53.81	8	Did not advance			
Chaz Davis	1500m T13	—N/a				3:58.28	10
Chaz Davis	5000m T13	—N/a				15:15.86	8
AJ Digby	200m T44	22.14	4 Q	—N/a		21.93	5
AJ Digby	400m T44	48.90	4 Q	—N/a		47.34	4
Joshua George	400m T53	50.11	5 q	—N/a		50.80	7
Joshua George	800m T53	1:37.87	3 Q	—N/a		1:41.23	5
Joshua George	1500m T54	3:06.43	11	Did not advance			
Joshua George	5000m T54	10:20.36	3 Q	—N/a		11:02.64	5
Joshua George	Marathon T54	—N/a				DNF	
Lex Gillette	100m T11	11.68	=9 q	11.73	11	Did not advance	
Ty Griffin	400m T20	DSQ		Did not advance			
Tyson Gunter	100m T13	11.68	12	Did not advance			
Tyson Gunter	400m T13	51.30	8 q	—N/a		50.36	7
Jaquvis Hart	400m T47	DSQ		Did not advance			
Erik Hightower	400m T54	49.19	14	Did not advance			
Gianfranco Iannotta	100m T52	17.20	1 Q	—N/a		17.17	1st place, gold medalist(s)
Gianfranco Iannotta	400m T52	1:00.59	3 Q	—N/a		1:02.16	3rd place, bronze medalist(s)
Desmond Jackson	100m T42	12.95	9	Did not advance			
Desmond Jackson	200m T42	DSQ		Did not advance			
Ayden Jent	100m T35	13.28	5 Q	—N/a		13.13	5
Ayden Jent	200m T35	28.81	8 Q	—N/a		27.45	5
Raymond Martin	100m T52	17.27	2 Q	—N/a		17.25	2nd place, silver medalist(s)
Raymond Martin	400m T52	57.77	1 Q	—N/a		58.42	1st place, gold medalist(s)
Raymond Martin	1500m T52	—N/a				3:40.53	1st place, gold medalist(s)
Aaron Pike	1500m T54	3:09.85	19	Did not advance			
Aaron Pike	Marathon T54	—N/a				1:30:13	10
Markeith Price	100m T13	11.23 PB	10	Did not advance			
Markeith Price	400m T13	50.20	7 q	—N/a		49.96	5
David Prince	200m T44	22.42	6 Q	—N/a		22.01	6
Austin Pruitt	100m T34	17.34	10	Did not advance			
Austin Pruitt	800m T34	1:46.38	4 Q	—N/a		1:45.55	6
John Roberts	100m T33	—N/a				21.88	7
Josh Roberts	100m T52	18.41	7 q	—N/a		18.39	8
Josh Roberts	1500m T52	—N/a				4:47.80	9
Nick Rogers	100m T44	11.26	8 q	—N/a		11.33	8
Nick Rogers	400m T44	49.45	5 Q	—N/a		48.90	5
Daniel Romanchuk	100m T54	15.61	16	Did not advance			
Daniel Romanchuk	400m T54	49.15	13	Did not advance			
Daniel Romanchuk	800m T54	1:39.29	17	Did not advance			
Daniel Romanchuk	1500m T54	3:07.93	14	Did not advance			
Daniel Romanchuk	5000m T54	10:40.40	13	Did not advance			
James Senbeta	800m T54	1:42.47	19	Did not advance			
James Senbeta	5000m T54	10:41.65	15	Did not advance			
James Senbeta	Marathon T54	—N/a				DNF	
Brian Siemann	100m T53	15.05	7 q	—N/a		15.23	7
Brian Siemann	800m T53	1:43.79	8 Q	—N/a		1:41.11	4
Jerome Singleton	100m T44	11.23	=6 q	—N/a		11.17	6
Roderick Townsend-Roberts	100m T47	11.07	6 Q	—N/a		11.08	5
Steven Toyoji	400m T52	1:06.15	14	Did not advance			
Shaquille Vance	100m T42	13.27	13	Did not advance			
Shaquille Vance	200m T42	24.65	3 Q	—N/a		24.86	4
Jarryd Wallace	100m T44	11.02	3 Q	—N/a		11.16	5
Ahkeel Whitehead	100m T37	12.21	11	Did not advance			
Hunter Woodhall	200m T44	21.50	2 Q	—N/a		21.12	2nd place, silver medalist(s)
Hunter Woodhall	400m T44	48.82	3 Q	—N/a		46.70	3rd place, bronze medalist(s)
Regas Woods	100m T42	13.06	10	Did not advance			
Regas Woods	200m T42	25.19	4 Q	—N/a		25.27	6
Jaquvis Hart; Jerome Singleton; Jarryd Wallace; Hunter Woodhall	4 × 100 m relay T42-47	—N/a				DSQ	

=== Men's field ===
Athlete	Events	Mark (m)	Points	Rank
Tobi Fawehinmi	Long jump T47	7.01	-	5
Lex Gillette	Long jump T11	6.44	-	2nd place, silver medalist(s)
Sam Grewe	High jump F42	1.86	-	2nd place, silver medalist(s)
Desmond Jackson	Long jump T42	4.91	-	7
Cody Jones	Javelin throw F38	40.53	-	8
Trenten Merrill	Long jump T44	6.84	-	4
Jerome Singleton	Long jump T44	5.56	-	13
Jeff Skiba	High jump T44	1.95	-	5
Jeff Skiba	Javelin throw F44	45.45	-	13
Nick Slade	Long jump T47	6.82	-	7
Roderick Townsend-Roberts	Long jump T47	7.41 PR	-	1st place, gold medalist(s)
Ahkeel Whitehead	Long jump T37	4.83	-	12
Regas Woods	Long jump F42	5.40	-	6

=== Women's track ===
Athlete	Events	Heat		Final	
Athlete	Events	Time	Rank	Time	Rank
Femita Ayanebeku	200m T44	28.58	7 q	28.81	6
Scout Bassett	100m T42	16.53	5 Q	16.66	5
Breanna Clark	400m T20	58.25	1 Q	57.79	1st place, gold medalist(s)
Kym Crosby	100m T13	12.49	4 Q	12.24	3rd place, bronze medalist(s)
Kym Crosby	400m T13	—N/a		57.26	4
Alexa Halko	100m T34	—N/a		18.81	3rd place, bronze medalist(s)
Alexa Halko	400m T34	—N/a		1:00.79	2nd place, silver medalist(s)
Alexa Halko	800m T34	—N/a		2:02.08	2nd place, silver medalist(s)
Jessica Heims	400m T44	—N/a		1:09.17	7
Lacey Henderson	100m T42	18.48	10	Did not advance	
April Holmes	200m T44	DSQ		Did not advance	
Kelsey Lefevour	100m T53	17.28	6 Q	17.31	7
Kelsey Lefevour	400m T53	1:01.50	12	Did not advance	
Kelsey Lefevour	800m T53	2:09.07	13	Did not advance	
Cheri Madsen	100m T54	16.56	5 Q	16.40	5
Cheri Madsen	400m T54	54.29	2 Q	54.50	2nd place, silver medalist(s)
Chelsea McClammer	400m T53	55.42	=3 Q	55.13	2nd place, silver medalist(s)
Chelsea McClammer	800m T53	1:52.96	6 Q	1:48.32	5
Chelsea McClammer	1500m T54	3:22.75	2 Q	3:22.67	3rd place, bronze medalist(s)
Chelsea McClammer	5000m T54	11:49.25	2 Q	11:54.33	2nd place, silver medalist(s)
Chelsea McClammer	Marathon T54	—N/a		DNF	
Hannah McFadden	100m T54	16.55	4 Q	16.34	4
Hannah McFadden	400m T54	55.98	6 q	56.20	7
Tatyana McFadden	100m T54	16.52	3 Q	16.13	2nd place, silver medalist(s)
Tatyana McFadden	400m T54	53.17	1 Q	53.30	1st place, gold medalist(s)
Tatyana McFadden	800m T54	1:45.16	1 Q	1:44.73	1st place, gold medalist(s)
Tatyana McFadden	1500m T54	3:27.41	3 Q	3:22.50	1st place, gold medalist(s)
Tatyana McFadden	5000m T54	11:47.37 PR	1 Q	11:54.07	1st place, gold medalist(s)
Tatyana McFadden	Marathon T54	—N/a		1:38:44	2nd place, silver medalist(s)
Amanda McGrory	800m T54	1:47.68	2 Q	1:45.23	4
Amanda McGrory	1500m T54	3:22.75	1 Q	3:22.61	2nd place, silver medalist(s)
Amanda McGrory	5000m T54	11:49.47	3 Q	11:54.34	3rd place, bronze medalist(s)
Amanda McGrory	Marathon T54	—N/a		1:38:45	3rd place, bronze medalist(s)
Cassie Mitchell	100m T52	—N/a		DSQ	
Kerri Morgan	100m T52	—N/a		19.96	2nd place, silver medalist(s)
Kerri Morgan	400m T52	—N/a		1:08.31	3rd place, bronze medalist(s)
Ivonne Mosquera-Schmidt	1500m T11	5:12.28	6 q	5:08.97	6
Grace Norman	400m T44	—N/a		1:01.83	3rd place, bronze medalist(s)
Shirley Reilly	400m T53	56.32	5 Q	56.10	5
Shirley Reilly	800m T53	1:49.69	4 q	1:47.77	3rd place, bronze medalist(s)
Susannah Scaroni	800m T54	1:56.42	13	Did not advance	
Susannah Scaroni	Marathon T54	—N/a		1:38:47	7
Allysa Seely	200m T36	32.36	7 q	32.40	6
Amy Watt	100m T47	13.66	10	Did not advance	
Amy Watt	400m T47	1:04.56	7 q	1:04.21	6
Liz Willis	200m T44	29.67	12	Did not advance	
Liz Willis	400m T44	—N/a		1:07.62	6
Deja Young	100m T47	12.12	1 Q	12.15	1st place, gold medalist(s)
Deja Young	200m T47	25.58	1 Q	25.46	1st place, gold medalist(s)
Cheri Madsen; Chelsea McClammer; Hannah McFadden; Tatyana McFadden	4 × 400 m relay T53-54	—N/a		DSQ	

=== Women's field ===
Athlete	Events	Mark (m)	Points	Rank
Scout Bassett	Long jump T42	2.94	-	10
Lacey Henderson	Long jump T42	3.33	-	8
Angela Madsen	Javelin throw F56	17.21	-	7
Angela Madsen	Shot put F57	8.35	-	8
Amy Watt	Long jump T47	5.15	-	6
Taleah Williams	Long jump T47	5.17	-	5

== Cycling ==
With one pathway for qualification being one highest ranked NPCs on the UCI Para-Cycling male and female Nations Ranking Lists on 31 December 2014, the United States qualified for the 2016 Summer Paralympics in Rio, assuming they continued to meet all other eligibility requirements.

Allison Jones went to Rio as the American with the most Paralympic Games appearance. Rio was her eighth Games. Oksana Masters had previously competed at the Paralympics in other sports, medalling in rowing at the 2012 Summer Paralympics in Rio and competing in Nordic skiing at the Winter Games.

== Equestrian ==
The country qualified to participate in the team event at the Rio Games. They earned additional individual slots via the Para Equestrian Individual Ranking List Allocation method following the suspension of Russia, and France Finland not using one of their allocated spots.

== Football 7-a-side ==
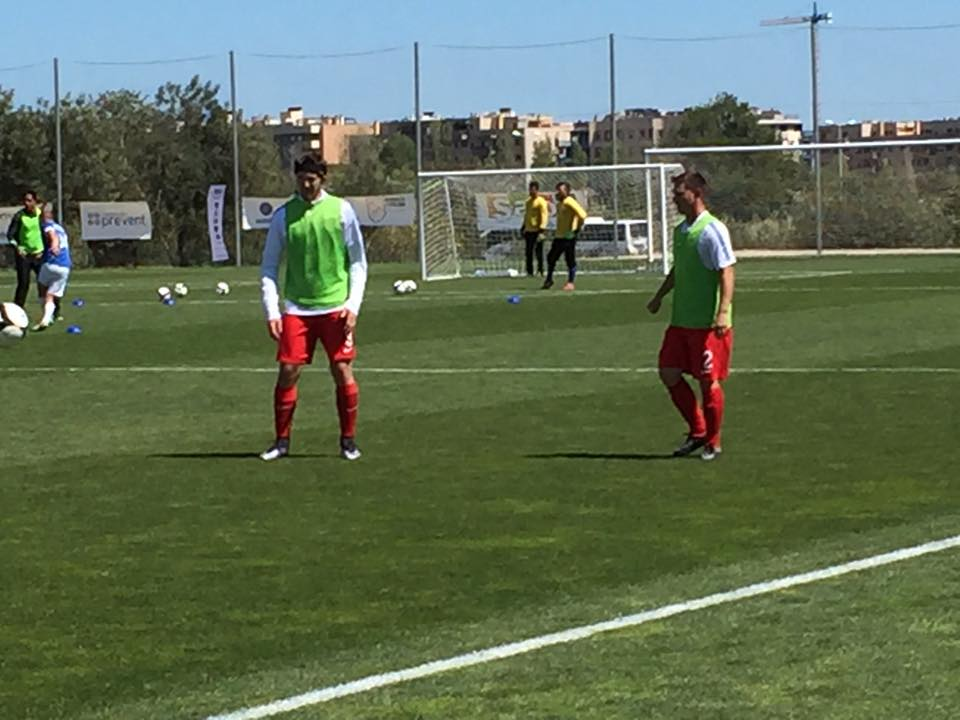
Members of Team USA warmup for their game against Brazil at the IFCPF Pre Paralympic Tournament Salou 2016, the last major preparation tournament for the Rio Paralympics.

United States national 7-a-side football team qualified for the Rio Paralympics at 2015 World Championships because of their seventh-place finish.

The draw for the tournament was held on May 6 at the 2016 Pre Paralympic Tournament in Salou, Spain. The United States was put into Group B with Argentina, Netherlands and Russia. Iran qualified for the 2016 Rio Games following the suspension of Russia. The IPC ruled that there could not be a redraw for the groups. This resulted in Iran being put into Group A with the Netherlands, Argentina and the United States.

The tournament where the Paralympic draw took place featured 7 of the 8 teams participating in Rio. It was the last major preparation event ahead of the Rio Games for all teams participating. The United States finished 6th after beating Argentina in one placement match 4 - 3 and losing to Ireland 4 - 1. The goals scored in the match against Argentina were the first the USA scored in the tournament, before putting up one more in their match against Ireland. Their roster for this tournament included Alex Hendricks, Sean Boyle, Keith Johnson, David Garza, Joshua Brunais, Bryce Boarman, Gavin Sibayan, Adam Ballou, Gregory Brigman, Mason Abbiate, Andrew Bremer, Sam Holmes, Kevin Hensley and Steven Bohlemann. They were coached by Stuart Sharp.

Going into the Rio Games, the country was ranked eighth in the world.

Pos	Team	Pld	W	D	L	GF	GA	GD	Pts	Qualification
1	Iran	3	3	0	0	7	1	+6	9	Semi finals
2	Netherlands	3	1	1	1	4	4	0	4	Semi finals
3	Argentina	3	1	0	2	4	7	−3	3	5th–6th place match
4	United States	3	0	1	2	4	7	−3	1	7th–8th place match

Source: Paralympic.org

== Goalball ==
=== Men ===
The United States men's national goalball team qualified for the Rio Games after finishing third at the 2014 IBSA Goalball World Championships. Joseph Hamilton, a member of the qualifying team, said after qualifying, "It's overwhelming for our team, we’ve come a long way. We didn't make the London 2012 Games that was very hard for us. To qualify for Rio at the first chance, and against a team that has been our nemesis in recent years, is awesome. If we play our own style, I believe we are one of the best teams in the world, and now we’ve got a chance to try to prove that on the grandest stage of all." The team returns to the Paralympics after having missed out on qualifying for the 2012 Summer Paralympics in London. The United States' men enter the tournament ranked 9th in the world.

The following is the United States roster in the men's goalball tournament of the 2016 Summer Paralympics.

No.	Player	Class	Date of birth (age)
1	Andy Jenks	B3	September 21, 1990 (aged 25)
2	Tyler Merren	B2	May 29, 1984 (aged 32)
3	Daryl Walker	B2	December 29, 1981 (aged 34)
4	John Kusku	B2	August 6, 1984 (aged 32)
5	Joseph Hamilton	B1	September 6, 1978 (aged 38)
7	Matt Simpson	B1	March 30, 1990 (aged 26)

Pos	Team	Pld	W	D	L	GF	GA	GD	Pts	Qualification
1	Lithuania	4	4	0	0	35	22	+13	12	Quarter-finals
2	United States	4	2	0	2	21	18	+3	6	Quarter-finals
3	Turkey	4	2	0	2	20	23	−3	6	Quarter-finals
4	China	4	1	0	3	25	28	−3	3	Quarter-finals
5	Finland	4	1	0	3	24	34	−10	3	

Source: Paralympic.org

9 September 2016; 09:00	United States	5–2	China	Future Arena, Rio de Janeiro; Referees: Rudi Janssen (BEL), Raquel Aguado (ESP)
9 September 2016; 09:00	Hamilton 3 Kusku 2	Report	Cai 2	Future Arena, Rio de Janeiro; Referees: Rudi Janssen (BEL), Raquel Aguado (ESP)

10 September 2016; 13:15	Lithuania	8–7	United States	Future Arena, Rio de Janeiro; Referees: Raquel Aguado (ESP); Patricia Fras (SLO)
10 September 2016; 13:15	Pavliukianec 6 Pazarauskas 2	Report	Hamilton 5 Merren 2	Future Arena, Rio de Janeiro; Referees: Raquel Aguado (ESP); Patricia Fras (SLO)

11 September 2016; 17:30	Finland	2–6	United States	Future Arena, Rio de Janeiro; Referees: Dawna Christy (CAN), Yoshinori Nii (JPN)
11 September 2016; 17:30	Mattila 1 Posio 1	Report	Merren 4 Hamilton 1 Kusku 1	Future Arena, Rio de Janeiro; Referees: Dawna Christy (CAN), Yoshinori Nii (JPN)

12 September 2016; 19:30	United States	3–6	Turkey	Future Arena, Rio de Janeiro; Referees: Raili Sipura (FIN), Daniel Voltan (BRA)
12 September 2016; 19:30	Kusku 1 Merren 1 Jenks 1	Report	Gündoğdu 4 Karakaya 2	Future Arena, Rio de Janeiro; Referees: Raili Sipura (FIN), Daniel Voltan (BRA)

14 September 2016; 12:00	United States	7–6	Germany	Future Arena, Rio de Janeiro; Referees: Daniel Voltan (BRA), Patricia Fras (SLO)
14 September 2016; 12:00	Merren 3 Hamilton 3 Kusku 1	Report	Steiger 3 Feistle 2 Horauf 1	Future Arena, Rio de Janeiro; Referees: Daniel Voltan (BRA), Patricia Fras (SLO)

15 September 2016; 13:30	Brazil	1–10	United States	Future Arena, Rio de Janeiro; Referees: Bülent Kimyon (TUR), Raili Sipura (FIN)
15 September 2016; 13:30	Marques 1	Report	Merren 9 Hamilton 1	Future Arena, Rio de Janeiro; Referees: Bülent Kimyon (TUR), Raili Sipura (FIN)

16 September 2016; 20:00	United States	8–14	Lithuania	Future Arena, Rio de Janeiro; Referees: Nejc Jakic (SLO), Daniel Voltan (BRA)
16 September 2016; 20:00	Simpson 4 Hamilton 1 Jenks 1 Merren 1 Walker 1	Report	Pavliukianec 8 Pazarauskas 6	Future Arena, Rio de Janeiro; Referees: Nejc Jakic (SLO), Daniel Voltan (BRA)

=== Women ===
The United States women's national goalball team qualified for the Rio Games after finishing first at the 2014 IBSA Goalball World Championships. The team goes to Rio having had a disappointing performance at the 2012 Summer Paralympics where they finished twelfth. Jen Armbruster's participation in Rio for the US women's national goalball team made for seven Games appearances. This total was the second highest Games appearances among US athletes attending the Rio Games. The United States' women enter the tournament ranked 4th in the world.

The following is the United States roster in the women's goalball tournament of the 2016 Summer Paralympics.

No.	Player	Class	Date of birth (age)
1	Jen Armbruster	B1	February 12, 1975 (aged 41)
3	Lisa Czechowski	B2	May 29, 1979 (aged 37)
4	Asya Miller	B3	October 16, 1979 (aged 36)
5	Amanda Dennis	B2	February 5, 1994 (aged 22)
7	Eliana Mason	B2	September 1, 1995 (aged 21)
9	Marybai Huking	B2	November 11, 1996 (aged 19)

Pos	Team	Pld	W	D	L	GF	GA	GD	Pts	Qualification
1	Brazil (H)	4	3	0	1	25	7	+18	9	Quarter-finals
2	United States	4	3	0	1	25	13	+12	9	Quarter-finals
3	Japan	4	2	1	1	13	8	+5	7	Quarter-finals
4	Israel	4	1	1	2	16	15	+1	4	Quarter-finals
5	Algeria	4	0	0	4	1	37	−36	0	

Source: Paralympic.org
(H) Hosts

8 September 2016; 10:15	United States	3–7	Brazil	Future Arena, Rio de Janeiro; Referees: Joelle Boulet (CAN), Dawna Christy (CAN)
8 September 2016; 10:15	Miller 2 Dennis 1	Report	Amorim 6 Custodio 1	Future Arena, Rio de Janeiro; Referees: Joelle Boulet (CAN), Dawna Christy (CAN)

9 September 2016; 14:30	Algeria	0–10 (walkover)	United States

11 September 2016; 10:45	United States	5–3	Japan	Future Arena, Rio de Janeiro; Referees: Nejc Jakic (SLO), Raquel Aguado (ESP)
11 September 2016; 10:45	Armbruster 2 Miller 2 Dennis 1	Report	Temma 1 Adachi 1 Komiya 1	Future Arena, Rio de Janeiro; Referees: Nejc Jakic (SLO), Raquel Aguado (ESP)

13 September 2016; 09:00	Israel	3–7	United States	Future Arena, Rio de Janeiro; Referees: Raquel Aguado (ESP), Dawna Christy (CAN)
13 September 2016; 09:00	Ben-David 3	Report	Miller 4 Czechowski 2 Dennis 1	Future Arena, Rio de Janeiro; Referees: Raquel Aguado (ESP), Dawna Christy (CAN)

14 September 2016; 19:30	United States	2–0	Canada	Future Arena, Rio de Janeiro; Referees: Vilma Basinkaite (LTU), Daniel Voltan (BRA)
14 September 2016; 19:30	Armbruster 2	Report		Future Arena, Rio de Janeiro; Referees: Vilma Basinkaite (LTU), Daniel Voltan (BRA)

15 September 2016; 20:00	Turkey	11–1	United States	Future Arena, Rio de Janeiro; Referees: Vilma Basinkaite (LTU), Nejc Jakic (SLO)
15 September 2016; 20:00	Altunoluk 8 Yıldız 2 Özcan 1	Report	Miller 1	Future Arena, Rio de Janeiro; Referees: Vilma Basinkaite (LTU), Nejc Jakic (SLO)

16 September 2016; 13:30	Brazil	2–3	United States	Future Arena, Rio de Janeiro; Referees: Dawna Christy (CAN), Raquel Aguado (ESP)
16 September 2016; 13:30	Custodio 1 Amorim 1	Report	Armbruster 3	Future Arena, Rio de Janeiro; Referees: Dawna Christy (CAN), Raquel Aguado (ESP)

== Judo ==
With one pathway for qualification being having a top finish at the 2014 IBSA Judo World Championships, the United States earned a qualifying spot in Rio base on the performance of Dartanyon Crockett in the men's -90 kg event. The B3 Judoka finished first in his class. Five judoka would eventually be named to the US squad in Rio, including returning Paralympian Dartanyon Crockett. The other four judoka were Christella Garcia, Ben Goodrich, Myles Porter and Sarah Chung.

== Paracanoe ==
Paracanoer Alana Nichols had previously competed at the Paralympics in alpine skiing and wheelchair basketball.

== Rowing ==
One pathway for qualifying for Rio involved having a boat have top eight finish at the 2015 FISA World Rowing Championships in a medal event. The United States qualified for the 2016 Games under this criterion in the AS Men's Single Sculls event with a fifth-place finish in a time of 04:59.510. The United States qualified a second boat in the AS Women's Single Sculls event with an eighth-place finish in a time of 05:49.760. The United States qualified a third boat with a second-place finish in the LTA Mixed Coxed Four event in a time of 03:19.820. This was less than a second behind the gold medal-winning boat, Great Britain, who had a time of 03:19.560.

At the US Olympic and Paralympic rowing team trials held in Sarasota, Florida in April 2016, Jacqui Kapinowski confirmed her qualification by winning the women's arms and shoulders single sculls (ASW1x) event in a time of 6 minutes 15.91 seconds, finishing ahead of second place athlete KateLynne Steinke by 15.61 seconds.

Jaclyn Smith is the only visually impaired competitor for the USA. She was scheduled to compete in the LTA Mix 4 event.

== Sailing ==
The American team qualified a boat for two of the three sailing classes at the Games through their results at the 2014 Disabled Sailing World Championships held in Halifax, Nova Scotia, Canada. Places were earned in the solo 2.4mR event and a crew also qualified for the two-person SKUD-18 class.

An alternative pathway for qualifying for Rio involved having a boat have top seven finish at the 2015 Combined World Championships in a medal event where the country had nor already qualified through via the 2014 IFDS Sailing World Championships. The Unite qualified for the 2016 Games under this criterion in the Sonar event with a sixth-place finish overall and the second country who had not qualified via the 2014 Championships.

Dee Smith, at 64 years of age, was the oldest member of the United States delegation in Rio.

== Shooting ==
The first opportunity to qualify for shooting at the Rio Games took place at the 2014 IPC Shooting World Championships in Suhl. Shooters earned spots for their NPC. The United States earned a qualifying spot at this competition in the R4 – 10m Air Rifle Standing Mixed SH2 event as a result of McKenna Dahl. Michael Tagliapietra earned a second spot for the US, with this spot in the P3 – 25m Pistol Mixed SH1 event.

The third opportunity for direct qualification for shooters to the Rio Paralympics took place at the 2015 IPC Shooting World Cup in Sydney, Australia. At this competition, John Joss III earned a qualifying spot for their country in the R6- Mixed 50m Rifle Prone SH1 event.

The last direct qualifying event for Rio in shooting took place at the 2015 IPC Shooting World Cup in Fort Benning in November. Tammy Delano earned a qualifying spot for their country at this competition in the R3 Mixed 10m Air Rifle Prone SH1 event. Jazmin Almlie earned a second spot for the United States at this event with her finished in the R4 Mixed Air Rifle Standing SH2 event.

John Joss III was one of three active service members competing at the Rio Games.

== Sitting volleyball ==
=== Men ===
United States men's national sitting volleyball team qualified for the 2016 Games at the 2015 Parapan American Games after winning a silver medal. It marks the team's return to the Paralympic level after having last appeared in 2004.

Pos	Team	Pld	W	L	Pts	SW	SL	SR	SPW	SPL	SPR	Qualification
1	Egypt	3	3	0	6	9	4	2.250	267	234	1.141	Semi-finals
2	Brazil (H)	3	2	1	5	8	4	2.000	278	212	1.311	Semi-finals
3	Germany	3	1	2	4	6	8	0.750	280	288	0.972	Classification 5th / 6th
4	United States	3	0	3	3	2	9	0.222	167	258	0.647	Classification 7th / 8th

Source: Paralympic.org
(H) Host

9 September 2016; 10:00	Brazil	3–0	United States	Riocentro - Pavilion 6, Rio de Janeiro
9 September 2016; 10:00	(25–14, 25–17, 25–14); Report			Riocentro - Pavilion 6, Rio de Janeiro

11 September 2016; 18:30	United States	2–3	Germany	Riocentro - Pavilion 6, Rio de Janeiro
11 September 2016; 18:30	(25–20, 15–25, 10–25, 25–23, 10–15); Report			Riocentro - Pavilion 6, Rio de Janeiro

13 September 2016; 14:00	Egypt	3–0	United States	Riocentro - Pavilion 6, Rio de Janeiro
13 September 2016; 14:00	(25–14, 25–9, 25–14); Report			Riocentro - Pavilion 6, Rio de Janeiro

=== Women ===
United States women's national sitting volleyball team qualified for the 2016 Games at the 2014 World ParaVolley Sitting Volleyball World Championships.

Group

Pos	Team	Pld	W	L	Pts	SW	SL	SR	SPW	SPL	SPR	Qualification
1	China	3	3	0	6	9	2	4.500	246	169	1.456	Semi-finals
2	United States	3	2	1	5	8	3	2.667	256	156	1.641	Semi-finals
3	Iran	3	1	2	4	3	6	0.500	160	197	0.812	Classification 5th / 6th
4	Rwanda	3	0	3	3	0	9	0.000	85	225	0.378	Classification 7th / 8th

Source: Paralympic.org

10 September 2016; 14:00	United States	3-0	Iran	Riocentro - Pavilion 6, Rio de Janeiro
10 September 2016; 14:00	(25–17, 25–13, 25–9); Report			Riocentro - Pavilion 6, Rio de Janeiro

12 September 2016; 18:30	China	3–2	United States	Riocentro - Pavilion 6, Rio de Janeiro
12 September 2016; 18:30	(25–17, 14–25, 14–25, 28–26, 15–13); Report			Riocentro - Pavilion 6, Rio de Janeiro

14 September 2016; 10:00	United States	3–0	Rwanda	Riocentro - Pavilion 6, Rio de Janeiro
14 September 2016; 10:00	(25–10, 25–8, 25–3); Report			Riocentro - Pavilion 6, Rio de Janeiro

Semi-final

15 September 2016; 20:30	Brazil	0–3	United States	Riocentro - Pavilion 6, Rio de Janeiro
15 September 2016; 20:30	(13–25, 26–28, 18–25); Report			Riocentro - Pavilion 6, Rio de Janeiro

Final

17 September 2016; 16:30	United States	3–0	China	Riocentro - Pavilion 6, Rio de Janeiro
17 September 2016; 16:30	(25–12, 25–12, 25–18); Report			Riocentro - Pavilion 6, Rio de Janeiro

== Table tennis ==
Tahl Leibovitz class 9 and Pamela Fontaine class 3 will compete represent USA in table tennis.

== Swimming ==
American swimmers competed at the 2015 IPC Swimming World Championships as part of their Rio qualifying efforts. The top two finishers in each Rio medal event at the 2015 IPC Swimming World Championships earned a qualifying spot for their country for Rio. Bradley Sndyer earned the United States a spot after winning gold in the Men's 100m Freestyle S11 with a time of 0:56.78. Jessica Long is expected to represent the United States in Rio. She had a strong performance at the 2015 IPC World Championships, winning seven medals, four of which were gold.

McClain Hermes is the youngest member of the United States Paralympic team. They turned 15 in January 2016. Jessica Long went to Rio as the most decorated American Paralympian at the Games. She had 17 total medals prior to Rio. Elizabeth Marks was one of three active American service members competing at the Rio Games. The USA team included nine visually impaired swimmers. These were Cailin Currie, Tharon Drake, Tucker Dupree, McClain Hermes, Letticia Martinez, Rebecca Meyers, Martha Ruether, Bradley Snyder and Colleen Young.

== Triathlon ==
Krige Schabort was a member of Team USA competing in the paratriathlon. He previously served in the South African Army. Grace Norman and Allysa Seely competed in both athletics and the paratriathlon in Rio.

There were four visually impaired paratriathletes on the USA team. They were Elizabeth Baker, Jillian Peterson, Particia Walsh and Jessica Jones Meyers.

== Wheelchair basketball ==
=== Men ===
The United States men's national wheelchair basketball team has qualified for the 2016 Rio Paralympics. They qualified through via the 2015 Parapan Am Games. They met Argentina in the semi-finals, whom they beat 59–36. They then went to the gold match medal game, where they defeated Canada 62–39.

During the draw, Brazil had the choice of which group they wanted to be in. They were partnered with Spain, who would be in the group Brazil did not select. Brazil chose Group B, which included Iran, the United States, Great Britain, Germany and Algeria. That left Spain in Group A with Australia, Canada, Turkey, the Netherlands and Japan.

Trevon Jenifer was the shortest member of the Team USA in Rio. He is 91.44 centimetres (36.00 in) tall due to congenital amputations in both his legs.

Pos	Team	Pld	W	L	PF	PA	PD	Pts	Qualification
1	United States	5	5	0	402	206	+196	10	Quarter-finals
2	Great Britain	5	4	1	364	263	+101	9	Quarter-finals
3	Brazil (H)	5	2	3	309	314	−5	7 (Note: Head-to-head record: Brazil 3 pts, +11 PD; Germany 3 pts, +6 PD; Iran 3 pts, −17 PD)	Quarter-finals
4	Germany	5	2	3	337	314	+23	7	Quarter-finals
5	Iran	5	2	3	295	361	−66	7	9th/10th place playoff
6	Algeria	5	0	5	187	436	−249	5	11th/12th place playoff

Source: Paralympic.org
Rules for classification: 1) Points; 2) Head-to-head results; 3) Points difference; 4) Points scored.
(H) Hosts

=== Women ===
The United States women's national wheelchair basketball team has qualified for the 2016 Rio Paralympics. The women qualified after claiming gold at the Parapan Am Games in 2015 after defeating Canada 80–72.

As hosts, Brazil got to choose which group they were put into. They were partnered with Algeria, who would be put in the group they did not choose. Brazil chose Group A, which included Canada, Germany, Great Britain and Argentina. Algeria ended up in Group B with the United States, the Netherlands, France and China.

Pos	Team	Pld	W	L	PF	PA	PD	Pts	Qualification
1	United States	4	4	0	288	138	+150	8	Quarter-finals
2	Netherlands	4	3	1	300	148	+152	7	Quarter-finals
3	China	4	2	2	212	187	+25	6	Quarter-finals
4	France	4	1	3	178	266	−88	5	Quarter-finals
5	Algeria	4	0	4	93	332	−239	4	9th/10th place playoff

Source: Paralympic.org
Rules for classification: 1) Points; 2) Head-to-head results; 3) Points difference; 4) Points scored.

== Wheelchair rugby ==
The United States qualified for the Rio Paralympics. They were scheduled to open play in Rio against France on September 14. Their second game was scheduled to be against Sweden on September 15. Their final game of group play as against Japan on September 16. The United States entered the tournament ranked number one in the world.

Pos	Team	Pld	W	D	L	GF	GA	GD	Pts	Qualification
1	United States	3	3	0	0	165	142	+23	6	Semi-finals
2	Japan	3	2	0	1	163	155	+8	4	Semi-finals
3	Sweden	3	1	0	2	145	151	−6	2	Fifth place Match
4	France	3	0	0	3	141	166	−25	0	Seventh place Match

Source: Rio2016
14 September 2016
12:45

United States	51–42	France
	Report

Carioca Arena 1, Rio de Janeiro
Referee: Jean Choiniere, Liam Costello

15 September 2016
10:30

Sweden	44–54	United States
	Report

Carioca Arena 1, Rio de Janeiro
Referee: Alexander Schriener, Lukasz Symczak

16 September 2016
16:00

United States	57–56	Japan
	Report

Carioca Arena 1, Rio de Janeiro
Referee: Pierre-Alexandre Briere, Lukasz Symczak

Semifinals

17 September 2016
12:45

United States	60–55	Canada
	Report

Carioca Arena 1, Rio de Janeiro
Referee: Alexander Schriener, Liam Costello

Gold-medal match

18 September 2016
12:30

(gold) Australia	59–58	(silver) United States
	Report

Carioca Arena 1, Rio de Janeiro
Referee: Pierre-Alexandre Briere, Alexander Schreiner

== Wheelchair tennis ==
The United States qualified two competitors in the men's single event as a result of Bipartite Commission Invitation places. The players invited were Steve Baldwin and Jon Rydberg. The United States qualified four players in the women's single event. Emmy Kaiser and Dana Mathewson qualified via the standard qualification route. Kaitlyn Verfuerth qualified via a Bipartite Commission Invitation place. Russia had qualified two player in the women's singles event, Ludmila Bubnova and Viktoriia Lvova. Following their suspension, one spot was re-allocated by the IPC to the United States' Shelby Baron. The United States qualified three players in the quad singles event. Nicholas Taylor and David Wagner qualified via the standard route. Bryan Barten qualified via a Bipartite Commission Invitation place.

== See also ==
- United States at the 2016 Summer Olympics
