= Athletics at the 2016 Summer Paralympics – Women's 400 metres T52 =

Women's 400 metres T52 at the XV Paralympic Games
- Venue: Estádio Olímpico João Havelange
- Dates: 10 September 2016
- Competitors: 5 from 5 nations

Medalists
1st place, gold medalist(s)		Michelle Stilwell	Canada
2nd place, silver medalist(s)		Marieke Vervoort	Belgium
3rd place, bronze medalist(s)		Kerry Morgan	United States

The T52 category is for wheelchair athletes with damage to spinal cord in the higher parts of the back, substantially impaired or no trunk function, and minimal or no leg function. Pushing power comes from elbow extensions, and appears close to normal except for use of modified gloves to compensate for grip.

The Athletics at the 2016 Summer Paralympics – Women's 400 metres T52 event at the 2016 Paralympic Games took place on 10 September 2016, at the Estádio Olímpico João Havelange.

== Final ==
11:04 10 September 2016:

Rank	Lane	Bib	Name	Nationality	Reaction	Time	Notes
1st place, gold medalist(s)	4	146	Michelle Stilwell	Canada		1:05.43	
2nd place, silver medalist(s)	3	71	Marieke Vervoort	Belgium		1:07.62	
3rd place, bronze medalist(s)	7	909	Kerry Morgan	United States		1:08.31	
4	5	466	Yuka Kiyama	Japan		1:21.87	
5	6	758	Norsilawati Binte Sa'at	Singapore		1:49.56	
