= Athletics at the 2016 Summer Paralympics =

Athletics at the XV Paralympic Games
- Venue: Estádio Olímpico João Havelange
- Dates: 8–18 September 2016
- Competitors: 1100 (660 men, 440 women)

Athletics events at the 2016 Summer Paralympics were held in the Estádio Olímpico João Havelange in Rio de Janeiro, Brazil, from 8 to 18 September 2016. 177 events were held across both genders where 1,100 athletes competed. The athletics programme was the largest element of the Games programme in terms of entrants and medals awarded.

== Classification and events ==
Athletes are given a classification depending on the type and extent of their disability. The classification system allows athletes to compete against others with a similar level of function.

The athletics classifications are:

- 11–13: Blind (11) and visually impaired (12, 13) athletes
- 20: Athletes with an intellectual disability
- 31–38: Athletes with cerebral palsy; 31-34 for wheelchair events, 35-38 for ambulant (running) events
- 40-41: Les Autres (others) (including people with dwarfism)
- 42–47: Amputees
- 51–58: Athletes with a spinal cord disability

The class numbers were given prefixes of "T" and "F" for track and field events, respectively. High jump and Long jump, while field events, usually attract a "T" classification

Visually impaired athletes classified 11 run with full eye shades and a guide runner, those classified 12 have the option of using a guide, while those classified 13 do not use a guide runner. Guide runners are awarded medals alongside their athletes.

On 9 June 2015, the IPC announced the final make up of the Rio 2016 athletics programme. There were several changes in the programme, including the elimination of triple jump events, and the reduction of events requiring a factoring system, as this was seen to undermine the image of the event as sport.

The following is a summary of all athletics events which took place at the Games:

=== Event summary table ===
Athletics at the 2016 Summer Paralympics - Men's Events (96)
Classification Event	Visual Impairment			ID	Cerebral Palsy athletes T32-34 Wheelchair : T35-38 Ambulant							RG		Amputee athletes						Wheelchair athletes Spinal injuries						
Classification Event	T11	T12	T13	T20	T32	T33	T34	T35	T36	T37	T38	T40	T41	T42	T43	T44	T45	T46	T47	T51	T52	T53	T54	T55	T56	T57
Classification Event	F11	F12	F13	F20	F32	F33	F34	F35	F36	F37	F38	F40	F41	F42	F43	F44	F45	F46	F47	F51	F52	F53	F54	F55	F56	F57
Track events
100 metres	●	●	●			●	●	●	●	●	●			●	>>	●	>>	>>	●	●	●	●	●			
200 metres	●	●						●						●	>>	●										
400 metres	●	●	●	●					●	●	●				>>	●	>>	>>	●	●	●	●	●			
800 metres							●		●												>>	●	●			
1500 metres	●	>>	●	●						●	●						>>	●		>>	●	>>	●			
5000 metres	●	>>	●																			>>	●			
Marathon	>>	●															>>	●			>>	>>	●			
4 × 100 m relay	●													●												
4 × 400 m relay																						●				
Field events
High Jump														●		●	>>	>>	●							
Long Jump	●	●		●					●	●	●			●	>>	●	>>	>>	●							
Shot Put	>>	●		●	●	●	●	●	●	●		●	●	●								●	>>	●	>>	●
Discus	●									●					>>	●				>>	●		>>	>>	●	
Javelin		>>	●				●				●	>>	●	>>	>>	●		●				>>	●		>>	●
Club throw					●															●						

Athletics at the 2016 Summer Paralympics - Women's Events (81)
Classification Event	Visual Impairment			ID	Cerebral Palsy athletes T32-34 Wheelchair : T35-38 Ambulant							RG		Amputee athletes						Wheelchair athletes Spinal injuries						
Classification Event	T11	T12	T13	T20	T32	T33	T34	T35	T36	T37	T38	T40	T41	T42	T43	T44	T45	T46	T47	T51	T52	T53	T54	T55	T56	T57
Classification Event	F11	F12	F13	F20	F32	F33	F34	F35	F36	F37	F38	F40	F41	F42	F43	F44	F45	F46	F47	F51	F52	F53	F54	F55	F56	F57
Track events
100 metres	●	●	●			>>	●	●	●	●	●			●	>>	●	>>	>>	●	>>	●	●	●			
200 metres	●	●						●	●						>>	●	>>	>>	●							
400 metres	●	●	●	●		>>	●			●	●				>>	●	>>	>>	●	>>	●	●	●			
800 metres							●														>>	●	●			
1500 metres	●	>>	●	●																		>>	●			
5000 metres																						>>	●			
Marathon	>>	●																			>>	>>	●			
4 × 100 m relay	●							●																		
4 × 400 m relay																						●				
Field events
Long Jump	●	●		●						●	●			●	>>	●	>>	>>	●							
Shot Put	>>	●		●	●	●	●	●	●	●		●	●									●	●		>>	●
Discus Throw	●									>>	●	>>	●		>>	●				>>	●		>>	●	>>	●
Javelin		>>	●				●			●							>>	●				>>	●	>>	●	
Club throw					●															●						

Key:
- ID : Classifications for intellectual disability
- RG : Les Autres classification, including dwarfism and restricted growth
- ● : Event in this classification
- >> : Competitors in this classification may take part in event for the next competed classification, e.g. T33 may compete in T34 event, or both T35 and T36 athletes may compete in a T37 event.

== Schedule ==
OC	Opening ceremony	●	Event finals	CC	Closing ceremony

September 2016	7 Wed	8 Thu	9 Fri	10 Sat	11 Sun	12 Mon	13 Tue	14 Wed	15 Thu	16 Fri	17 Sat	18 Sun		Gold medals
Athletics	OC	10	20	16	19	14	19	14	19	14	25	5	CC	177

== Participating nations ==
A total of 1,139 athletes from 146 nations competed.

- Afghanistan (1)
- Algeria (21)
- Angola (4)
- Argentina (12)
- Australia (45)
- Austria (5)
- Azerbaijan (10)
- Bahrain (2)
- Belarus (6)
- Belgium (5)
- Benin (1)
- Bermuda (1)
- Bosnia and Herzegovina (2)
- Botswana (1)
- Brazil (61)
- Bulgaria (5)
- Burkina Faso (1)
- Burundi (1)
- Cambodia (1)
- Cameroon (1)
- Canada (22)
- Cape Verde (2)
- Central African Republic (1)
- Chile (4)
- China (75)
- Chinese Taipei (2)
- Colombia (19)
- Republic of the Congo (1)
- Costa Rica (1)
- Croatia (11)
- Cuba (11)
- Cyprus (1)
- Czech Republic (11)
- Democratic Republic of the Congo (2)
- Denmark (7)
- Dominican Republic (1)
- Timor-Leste (2)
- Ecuador (5)
- Egypt (7)
- Estonia (2)
- Ethiopia (5)
- Fiji (1)
- Finland (7)
- France (20)
- Gabon (1)
- The Gambia (1)
- Germany (38)
- Ghana (1)
- Great Britain (54)
- Greece (18)
- Guatemala (1)
- Guinea (1)
- Guinea-Bissau (1)
- Haiti (1)
- Hong Kong (1)
- Hungary (5)
- Iceland (1)
- India (15)
- Individual Paralympic Athletes (1)
- Indonesia (2)
- Iran (26)
- Iraq (6)
- Ireland (10)
- Israel (1)
- Italy (13)
- Ivory Coast (4)
- Jamaica (3)
- Japan (36)
- Jordan (1)
- Kazakhstan (1)
- Kenya (7)
- Kuwait (5)
- Kyrgyzstan (1)
- Latvia (4)
- Lesotho (2)
- Libya (1)
- Lithuania (4)
- Luxembourg (1)
- Madagascar (1)
- Malawi (1)
- Malaysia (9)
- Mali (2)
- Mauritius (1)
- Mexico (27)
- Moldova (1)
- Mongolia (1)
- Montenegro (1)
- Morocco (14)
- Mozambique (1)
- Myanmar (1)
- Namibia (7)
- Nepal (1)
- Netherlands (14)
- New Zealand (8)
- Nicaragua (2)
- Niger (2)
- Nigeria (6)
- North Korea (2)
- Norway (2)
- Oman (2)
- Pakistan (1)
- Palestine (1)
- Panama (2)
- Papua New Guinea (2)
- Peru (5)
- Philippines (1)
- Poland (31)
- Portugal (17)
- Qatar (3)
- Romania (2)
- Rwanda (1)
- Samoa (2)
- São Tomé and Príncipe (1)
- Saudi Arabia (3)
- Senegal (2)
- Serbia (6)
- Seychelles (1)
- Singapore (3)
- Slovakia (2)
- Slovenia (1)
- Somalia (1)
- South Africa (19)
- South Korea (5)
- Spain (22)
- Sri Lanka (7)
- Suriname (1)
- Sweden (5)
- Switzerland (11)
- Syria (1)
- Tajikistan (1)
- Tanzania (1)
- Thailand (13)
- Tonga (2)
- Trinidad and Tobago (2)
- Tunisia (31)
- Turkey (9)
- Uganda (1)
- Ukraine (26)
- United Arab Emirates (11)
- United States (73)
- Uruguay (1)
- Uzbekistan (11)
- Venezuela (13)
- Vietnam (3)
- Virgin Islands (1)
- Zimbabwe (1)

== Medal summary ==
Rank	Nation	Gold	Silver	Bronze	Total
1	China (CHN)	32	23	12	67
2	United States (USA)	16	15	11	42
3	Great Britain (GBR)	15	7	11	33
4	Germany (GER)	9	9	7	25
5	Brazil (BRA)	8	14	11	33
6	Tunisia (TUN)	7	6	6	19
7	Cuba (CUB)	6	1	3	10
8	South Africa (RSA)	5	6	4	15
9	Poland (POL)	4	9	4	17
10	Ukraine (UKR)	4	8	7	19
11	Algeria (ALG)	4	5	6	15
12	Thailand (THA)	4	3	2	9
13	Australia (AUS)	3	9	14	26
14	Canada (CAN)	3	3	2	8
15	France (FRA)	3	2	4	9
15	New Zealand (NZL)	3	2	4	9
17	Greece (GRE)	3	2	2	7
17	Spain (ESP)	3	2	2	7
19	Morocco (MAR)	3	2	1	6
20	Netherlands (NED)	3	1	3	7
20	Uzbekistan (UZB)	3	1	3	7
22	Kenya (KEN)	3	1	2	6
23	Malaysia (MAS)	3	0	1	4
24	Italy (ITA)	2	2	2	6
25	Ireland (IRL)	2	2	1	5
26	Switzerland (SUI)	2	2	0	4
27	Belgium (BEL)	2	1	1	4
27	India (IND)	2	1	1	4
29	Iraq (IRQ)	2	1	0	3
30	Latvia (LAT)	2	0	2	4
31	Nigeria (NGR)	2	0	1	3
32	Iran (IRI)	1	6	5	12
33	Mexico (MEX)	1	2	3	6
34	Namibia (NAM)	1	2	2	5
35	Colombia (COL)	1	1	5	7
36	Argentina (ARG)	1	1	2	4
37	Croatia (CRO)	1	1	1	3
37	Finland (FIN)	1	1	1	3
37	Serbia (SRB)	1	1	1	3
37	Trinidad and Tobago (TTO)	1	1	1	3
37	United Arab Emirates (UAE)	1	1	1	3
42	Lithuania (LTU)	1	1	0	2
43	Bahrain (BRN)	1	0	0	1
43	Bulgaria (BUL)	1	0	0	1
43	Kuwait (KUW)	1	0	0	1
46	Japan (JPN)	0	4	3	7
47	Azerbaijan (AZE)	0	4	1	5
48	Venezuela (VEN)	0	3	2	5
49	Qatar (QAT)	0	2	0	2
50	South Korea (KOR)	0	1	2	3
51	Denmark (DEN)	0	1	1	2
52	Egypt (EGY)	0	1	0	1
52	Ethiopia (ETH)	0	1	0	1
52	Hungary (HUN)	0	1	0	1
52	Ivory Coast (CIV)	0	1	0	1
52	Uganda (UGA)	0	1	0	1
57	Austria (AUT)	0	0	2	2
57	Portugal (POR)	0	0	2	2
59	Belarus (BLR)	0	0	1	1
59	Cape Verde (CPV)	0	0	1	1
59	Czech Republic (CZE)	0	0	1	1
59	Mozambique (MOZ)	0	0	1	1
59	Pakistan (PAK)	0	0	1	1
59	Saudi Arabia (KSA)	0	0	1	1
59	Slovakia (SVK)	0	0	1	1
59	Sri Lanka (SRI)	0	0	1	1
59	Turkey (TUR)	0	0	1	1
59	Vietnam (VIE)	0	0	1	1
Totals (68 entries)		177	178	175	530

== See also ==
- Athletics at the 2016 Summer Olympics
