= Tomoki Sato =

Japanese Paralympic athlete

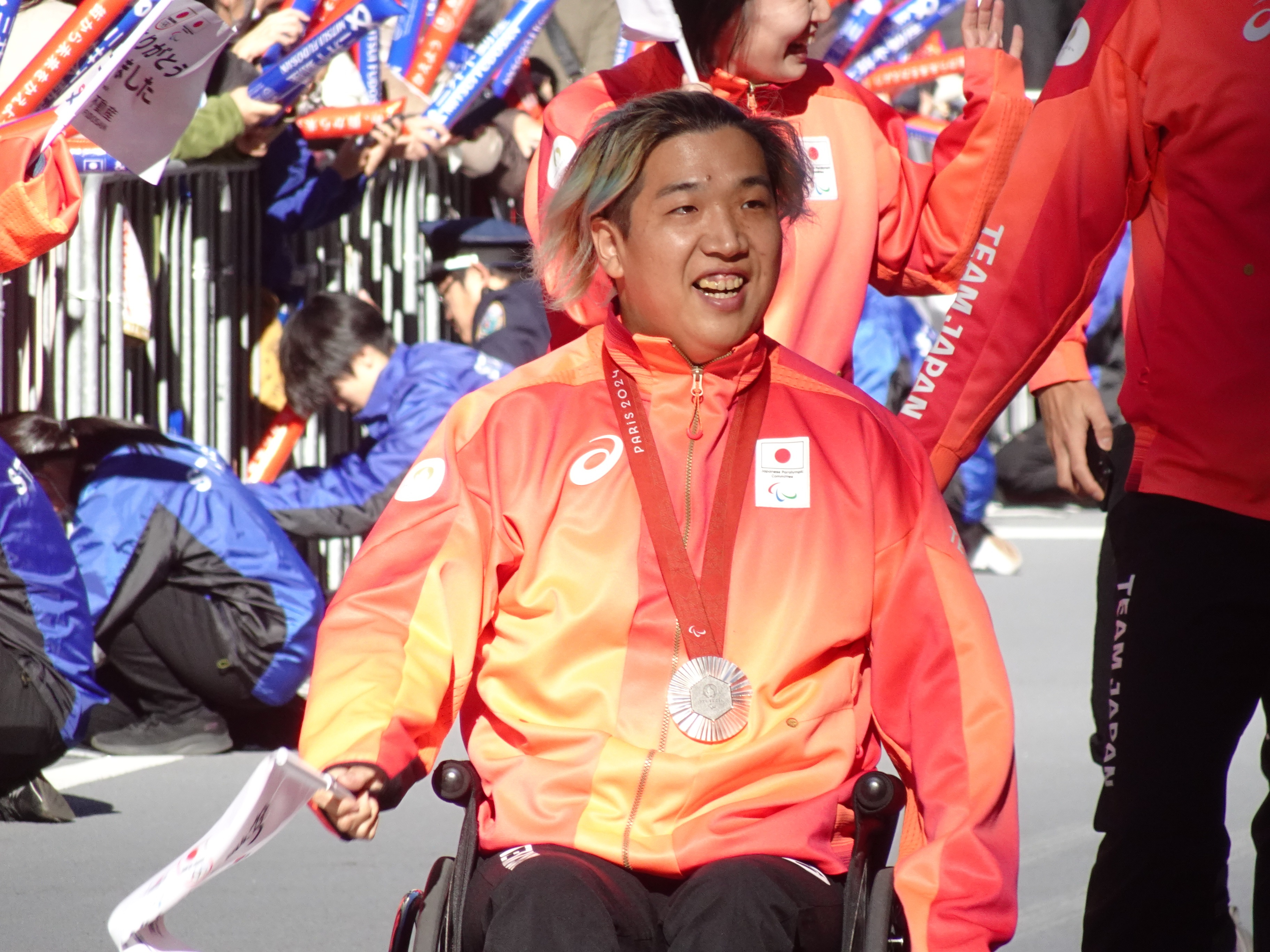
- Sato at the 2024 Summer Paralympics Japan National Team parade event in November 2024

Personal information
- Born: 8 September 1989 (age 37) Fujieda, Shizuoka

Sport
- Country: Japan
- Sport: Para-athletics
- Disability class: T52
- Events: 400 metres; 1500 metres
- Team: Red Velvet Racing Team
- Coached by: Arno Mul
Medal record
Men's para-athletics
Representing Japan
Summer Paralympics
Gold medal – first place	2020 Tokyo	400 m T52
Silver medal – second place	2016 Rio de Janeiro	400 m T52
Silver medal – second place	2016 Rio de Janeiro	1500 m T52
Silver medal – second place	2024 Paris	400 m T52
Bronze medal – third place	2024 Paris	100 m T52
World Championships
Gold medal – first place	2015 Doha	400 m T52
Gold medal – first place	2019 Dubai	400 m T52
Gold medal – first place	2019 Dubai	1500 m T52
Gold medal – first place	2023 Paris	1500 m T52
Gold medal – first place	2025 New Delhi	400 m T52
Gold medal – first place	2025 New Delhi	1500 m T52
Silver medal – second place	2024 Kobe	400 m T52
Silver medal – second place	2024 Kobe	1500 m T52
Silver medal – second place	2025 New Delhi	100 m T52
Bronze medal – third place	2015 Doha	1500 m T52
Bronze medal – third place	2024 Kobe	100 m T52
Asian Para Games
Gold medal – first place	2026 Aichi–Nagoya	100 m T51/T52
Gold medal – first place	2026 Aichi–Nagoya	400 m T51/T52

Tomoki Sato (佐藤 友祈, Satō Tomoki, born 8 September 1989 in Fujieda, Shizuoka) is a Japanese Paralympic athlete. He won the silver medal in both the men's 400 metres T52 and men's 1500 metres T52 events at the 2016 Summer Paralympics held in Rio de Janeiro, Brazil.

== Career ==
In 2015, he won the gold medal in the men's 400 metres T52 event at the IPC Athletics World Championships held in Doha, Qatar. He also won the bronze medal in the men's 1500 metres T52 event.

He won the gold medal in the men's 400 metres T52 event at the 2019 World Para Athletics Championships held in Dubai, United Arab Emirates. He also won the gold medal in the men's 1500 metres T52 event.
