= Athletics at the 2016 Summer Paralympics – Women's 1500 metres T54 =

Women's 1500 metres T54 at the XV Paralympic Games
- Venue: Estádio Olímpico João Havelange
- Dates: 13 September 2016
- Competitors: 16 from 10 nations

Medalists
1st place, gold medalist(s)		Tatyana McFadden	United States
2nd place, silver medalist(s)		Amanda McGrory	United States
3rd place, bronze medalist(s)		Chelsea McClammer	United States

The T54 category is for wheelchair athletes with no leg function, but near full arm function and reasonable to normal trunk function. Typically this may be caused by a lower spinal cord injury or spinal cord birth defect.

The Athletics at the 2016 Summer Paralympics – Women's 1500 metres T54 event at the 2016 Paralympic Games took place on 13 September 2016, at the Estádio Olímpico João Havelange.

== Heats ==
=== Heat 1 ===
18:19 12 September 2016:

Rank	Lane	Bib	Name	Nationality	Reaction	Time	Notes
1	3	906	Tatyana McFadden	United States		3:27.41	Q
2	4	36	Madison de Rozario	Australia		3:31.54	Q
3	5	145	Diane Roy	Canada		3:32.13	Q
4	6	615	Margriet van den Broek	Netherlands		3:32.70	
5	1	777	Catherine Debrunner	Switzerland		3:32.71	
6	7	472	Kazumi Nakayama	Japan		3:32.90	
7	2	30	Angela Ballard	Australia		3:33.05	
8	8	104	Maria de Fatima Fonseca Chaves	Brazil		3:37.16	

=== Heat 2 ===
18:27 12 September 2016:

Rank	Lane	Bib	Name	Nationality	Reaction	Time	Notes
1	8	907	Amanda McGrory	United States		3:22.75	Q
2	6	904	Chelsea McClammer	United States		3:22.76	Q
3	2	780	Manuela Schaer	Switzerland		3:25.16	Q
4	5	35	Christie Dawes	Australia		3:28.57	q
5	7	171	Jing Ma	China		3:28.63	q
6	4	111	Aline Rocha	Brazil		3:30.40	q
7	1	787	Gunilla Wallengren	Sweden		3:30.99	q
8	3	335	Jade Jones	Great Britain		3:32.88	

== Final ==
18:14 13 September 2016:

Rank	Lane	Bib	Name	Nationality	Reaction	Time	Notes
1st place, gold medalist(s)	8	906	Tatyana McFadden	United States		3:22.50	
2nd place, silver medalist(s)	6	907	Amanda McGrory	United States		3:22.61	
3rd place, bronze medalist(s)	2	904	Chelsea McClammer	United States		3:22.67	
4	1	780	Manuela Schaer	Switzerland		3:23.41	
5	4	36	Madison de Rozario	Australia		3:24.33	
6	3	145	Diane Roy	Canada		3:24.57	
7	10	171	Jing Ma	China		3:24.88	
8	7	35	Christie Dawes	Australia		3:26.00	
9	9	111	Aline Rocha	Brazil		3:27.61	
10	5	787	Gunilla Wallengren	Sweden		3:30.14	
