= Athletics at the 2016 Summer Paralympics – Women's 400 metres T53 =

Women's 400 metres T53 at the XV Paralympic Games
- Venue: Estádio Olímpico João Havelange
- Dates: 11 September 2016
- Competitors: 13 from 9 nations

Medalists
1st place, gold medalist(s)		Hongzhuan Zhou	China
2nd place, silver medalist(s)		Chelsea McClammer	United States
3rd place, bronze medalist(s)		Angela Ballard	Australia

The T53 category is for wheelchair athletes with normal use of arms and hands, no or limited trunk function, and no leg function.

The Athletics at the 2016 Summer Paralympics – Women's 400 metres T53 event at the 2016 Paralympic Games took place on 11 September 2016, at the Estádio Olímpico João Havelange.

== Heats ==
=== Heat 1 ===
12:33 10 September 2016:

Rank	Lane	Bib	Name	Nationality	Reaction	Time	Notes
1	3	188	Hongzhuan Zhou	China		55.42	Q
2	8	913	Shirley Reilly	United States		56.32	Q
3	4	849	Hamide Kurt	Turkey		56.72	Q
4	5	337	Samantha Kinghorn	Great Britain		56.76	q
5	6	140	Ilana Dupont	Canada		1:00.03	
6	7	77	Jessica Cooper Lewis	Bermuda		1:00.25	

=== Heat 2 ===
12:41 10 September 2016:

Rank	Lane	Bib	Name	Nationality	Reaction	Time	Notes
1	2	30	Angela Ballard	Australia		55.26	Q
2	3	904	Chelsea McClammer	United States		55.42	Q
3	7	162	Lisha Huang	China		55.63	Q
4	8	777	Catherine Debrunner	Switzerland		57.57	q
5	4	472	Kazumi Nakayama	Japan		59.45	
6	5	901	Kelsey Lefevour	United States		1:01.50	
7	6	846	Zeynep Acet	Turkey		1:08.77	

== Final ==
17:30 11 September 2016:

Rank	Lane	Bib	Name	Nationality	Reaction	Time	Notes
1st place, gold medalist(s)	3	188	Hongzhuan Zhou	China		54.43	
2nd place, silver medalist(s)	6	904	Chelsea McClammer	United States		55.13	
3rd place, bronze medalist(s)	5	30	Angela Ballard	Australia		55.28	
4	8	162	Lisha Huang	China		55.52	
5	4	913	Shirley Reilly	United States		56.10	
6	7	849	Hamide Kurt	Turkey		57.61	
7	1	777	Catherine Debrunner	Switzerland		58.29	
	2	337	Samantha Kinghorn	Great Britain			DSQ
