= Athletics at the 2016 Summer Paralympics – Women's 400 metres T54 =

Women's 400 metres T54 at the XV Paralympic Games
- Venue: Estádio Olímpico João Havelange
- Dates: 11 September 2016
- Competitors: 13 from 9 nations

Medalists
1st place, gold medalist(s)		Tatyana McFadden	United States
2nd place, silver medalist(s)		Cheri Madsen	United States
3rd place, bronze medalist(s)		Lihong Zou	China

The T54 category is for wheelchair athletes with no leg function, but near full arm function and reasonable to normal trunk function. Typically this may be caused by a lower spinal cord injury or spinal cord birth defect.

The Athletics at the 2016 Summer Paralympics – Women's 400 metres T54 event at the 2016 Paralympic Games took place on 11 September 2016, at the Estádio Olímpico João Havelange.

== Heats ==
=== Heat 1 ===
10:00 11 September 2016:

Rank	Lane	Bib	Name	Nationality	Reaction	Time	Notes
1	5	903	Cheri Madsen	United States		54.29	Q
2	7	190	Lihong Zou	China		54.93	Q
3	3	171	Jing Ma	China		56.38	Q
4	4	615	Margriet van den Broek	Netherlands		56.78	q
5	6	145	Diane Roy	Canada		57.29	
6	8	850	Zubeyde Supurgeci	Turkey		1:04.29	

=== Heat 2 ===
10:06 11 September 2016:

Rank	Lane	Bib	Name	Nationality	Reaction	Time	Notes
1	6	906	Tatyana McFadden	United States		53.17	Q
2	2	170	Wenjun Liu	China		54.90	Q
3	8	780	Manuela Schaer	Switzerland		55.85	Q
4	4	905	Hannah McFadden	United States		55.98	q
5	7	297	Amanda Kotaja	Finland		59.17	
6	3	47	Jemima Moore	Australia		1:00.24	
7	5	552	Alicia Ibarra Barajas	Mexico		1:04.20	

== Final ==
17:37 11 September 2016:

Rank	Lane	Bib	Name	Nationality	Reaction	Time	Notes
1st place, gold medalist(s)	6	906	Tatyana McFadden	United States		53.30	
2nd place, silver medalist(s)	4	903	Cheri Madsen	United States		54.50	
3rd place, bronze medalist(s)	3	190	Lihong Zou	China		54.70	
4	5	170	Wenjun Liu	China		54.72	
5	7	780	Manuela Schaer	Switzerland		55.27	
6	8	171	Jing Ma	China		55.83	
7	2	905	Hannah McFadden	United States		56.20	
8	1	615	Margriet van den Broek	Netherlands		57.37	
