= Athletics at the 2016 Summer Paralympics – Women's 400 metres T44 =

Women's 400 metres T44 at the XV Paralympic Games
- Venue: Estádio Olímpico João Havelange
- Dates: 12 September 2016
- Competitors: 8 from 5 nations

Medalists
1st place, gold medalist(s)		Marie-Amelie le Fur	France
2nd place, silver medalist(s)		Irmgard Bensusan	Germany
3rd place, bronze medalist(s)		Grace Norman	United States

The T44 category is for athletes who have a single below knee amputation or who can walk with moderately reduced function in one or both legs.

The Athletics at the 2016 Summer Paralympics – Women's 400 metres T44 event at the 2016 Paralympic Games took place on 12 September 2016, at the Estádio Olímpico João Havelange.

== Final ==
18:12 12 September 2016:

Rank	Lane	Bib	Name	Nationality	Reaction	Time	Notes
1st place, gold medalist(s)	6	308	Marie-Amelie le Fur	France		59.27	
2nd place, silver medalist(s)	3	359	Irmgard Bensusan	Germany		59.62	
3rd place, bronze medalist(s)	1	912	Grace Norman	United States		1:01.83	
4	2	452	Federica Maspero	Italy		1:03.83	
5	5	271	Sara Andres Barrio	Spain		1:05.64	
6	7	918	Liz Willis	United States		1:07.62	
7	4	898	Jessica Heims	United States		1:09.17	
	8	453	Giuseppina Versace	Italy			DSQ
