= Athletics at the 2016 Summer Paralympics – Men's 400 metres T52 =

Men's 400 metres T52 at the XV Paralympic Games
- Venue: Estádio Olímpico João Havelange
- Dates: 12–13 September 2016
- Competitors: 15 from 10 nations

Medalists
1st place, gold medalist(s)		Raymond Martin	United States
2nd place, silver medalist(s)		Tomoki Sato	Japan
3rd place, bronze medalist(s)		Gianfranco Iannotta	United States

The T52 category is for wheelchair athletes with damage to spinal cord in the higher parts of the back, substantially impaired or no trunk function, and minimal or no leg function. Pushing power comes from elbow extensions, and appears close to normal except for use of modified gloves to compensate for grip.

The Athletics at the 2016 Summer Paralympics – Men's 400 metres T52 event at the 2016 Paralympic Games took place on 12–13 September 2016, at the Estádio Olímpico João Havelange.

== Heats ==
=== Heat 1 ===
10:00 12 September 2016:

Rank	Lane	Bib	Name	Nationality	Reaction	Time	Notes
1	4	2363	Raymond Martin	United States		57.77	Q
2	6	2359	Gianfranco Iannotta	United States		1:00.59	Q
3	8	2053	Mario Trindade	Portugal		1:02.51	Q
4	2	1745	Hirokazu Ueyonabaru	Japan		1:02.80	q
5	5	1074	Thomas Geierspichler	Austria		1:03.27	
6	7	2176	Beat Boesch	Switzerland		1:03.73	
7	3	1876	Salvador Hernandez Mondragon	Mexico		1:03.86	

=== Heat 2 ===
10:08 12 September 2016:

Rank	Lane	Bib	Name	Nationality	Reaction	Time	Notes
1	3	1741	Tomoki Sato	Japan		59.41	Q
2	6	1881	Leonardo de Jesus Perez Juarez	Mexico		1:02.12	Q
3	1	2001	Jerrold Pete Mangliwan	Philippines		1:02.67	Q
4	8	2231	Pichaya Kurattanasiri	Thailand		1:03.03	q
5	7	1737	Akikazu Noda	Japan		1:03.28	
6	2	1309	Cristian Torres	Colombia		1:05.14	
7	4	2380	Steven Toyoji	United States		1:06.15	
	5	1058	Sam McIntosh	Australia			DSQ

== Final ==
10:20 13 September 2016:

Rank	Lane	Bib	Name	Nationality	Reaction	Time	Notes
1st place, gold medalist(s)	3	2363	Raymond Martin	United States		58.42	
2nd place, silver medalist(s)	4	1741	Tomoki Sato	Japan		58.88	
3rd place, bronze medalist(s)	5	2359	Gianfranco Iannotta	United States		1:02.16	
4	6	1881	Leonardo de Jesus Perez Juarez	Mexico		1:02.87	
5	2	2231	Pichaya Kurattanasiri	Thailand		1:03.27	
6	1	1745	Hirokazu Ueyonabaru	Japan		1:04.72	
7	8	2001	Jerrold Pete Mangliwan	Philippines		1:04.93	
8	7	2053	Mario Trindade	Portugal		1:05.35	
