= Pichaya Kurattanasiri =

Thai Paralympian track and field athlete

Personal information
- Born: 17 March 1988 (age 38)

Sport
- Country: Thailand
- Sport: Paralympic athletics
- Disability class: T52

Achievements and titles
- Paralympic finals: 2016 Rio de Janeiro
Medal record
Men's paralympic athletics
Representing Thailand
Paralympic Games
Bronze medal – third place	2016 Rio de Janeiro	1500 m T52
World Championships
Bronze medal – third place	2015 Doha	400 m T52
Bronze medal – third place	2023 Paris	1500 m T52
Asian Para Games
Gold medal – first place	2014 Incheon	400 m T52
Silver medal – second place	2022 Hangzhou	200 m T52
Bronze medal – third place	2014 Incheon	100 m T52
ASEAN Para Games
Gold medal – first place	2015 Singapore	400 m T52
Silver medal – second place	2015 Singapore	100 m T52

Pichaya Kurattanasiri (born 17 March 1988) is a Thai Paralympic track and field athlete who competes in T52 sprint events.

== Career ==
He claimed a bronze medal in the men's 400 m T52 at the 2015 IPC Athletics World Championships which was also eventually his first medal at the IPC Athletics World Championships.

He made his debut appearance at the Paralympics representing Thailand at the 2016 Summer Paralympics and competed in the men's 100m T52, men's 400m T52 and men's 1500m T52. He claimed bronze medal in the 1500m T52 which was his first Paralympic medal.
