= Athletics at the 2016 Summer Paralympics – Men's 1500 metres T20 =

Men's 1500 metres T20 at the XV Paralympic Games
- Venue: Estádio Olímpico João Havelange
- Dates: 13 September 2016
- Competitors: 9 from 8 nations

Medalists
1st place, gold medalist(s)		Michael Brannigan	United States
2nd place, silver medalist(s)		Daniel Pek	Poland
3rd place, bronze medalist(s)		Peyman Nasiri Bazanjani	Iran

The T20 category is for athletes with intellectual impairment. T20 athletes have an IQ score of 75 or less.

The Athletics at the 2016 Summer Paralympics – Men's 1500 metres T20 event at the 2016 Paralympic Games took place on 13 September 2016, at the Estádio Olímpico João Havelange.

== Final ==
10:58 13 September 2016:

Rank	Lane	Bib	Name	Nationality	Reaction	Time	Notes
1st place, gold medalist(s)	2	2346	Michael Brannigan	United States		3:51.73	
2nd place, silver medalist(s)	8	2031	Daniel Pek	Poland		3:56.17	
3rd place, bronze medalist(s)	5	1656	Peyman Nasiri Bazanjani	Iran		3:56.24	
4	6	2024	Rafal Korc	Poland		3:56.54	
5	3	2331	Pavlo Voluikevych	Ukraine		3:58.18	
6	1	1514	Steve Morris	Great Britain		3:58.69	
7	7	2051	Cristiano Pereira	Portugal		3:59.92	
8	9	2411	Luis Arturo Paiva	Venezuela		4:11.20	
9	4	1379	Mohamed Hersi	Denmark		4:11.41	
