= Athletics at the 2016 Summer Paralympics – Men's 1500 metres T52 =

Men's 1500 metres T52 at the XV Paralympic Games
- Venue: Estádio Olímpico João Havelange
- Dates: 15 September 2016
- Competitors: 10 from 6 nations

Medalists
| 1st place, gold medalist(s) | | Raymond Martin | United States |
| 2nd place, silver medalist(s) | | Tomoki Sato | Japan |
| 3rd place, bronze medalist(s) | | Pichaya Kurattanasiri | Thailand |

The T52 category is for wheelchair athletes with damage to spinal cord in the higher parts of the back, substantially impaired or no trunk function, and minimal or no leg function. Pushing power comes from elbow extensions, and appears close to normal except for use of modified gloves to compensate for grip.

The men's 1500 metres T52 event at the 2016 Paralympic Games took place on 15 September 2016, at the Estádio Olímpico João Havelange.

== Final ==
10:24 15 September 2016:

| Rank | Lane | Bib | Name | Nationality | Reaction | Time | Notes |
|---|---|---|---|---|---|---|---|
| 1st place, gold medalist(s) | 7 | 2363 | Raymond Martin | United States | | 3:40.63 | |
| 2nd place, silver medalist(s) | 6 | 1741 | Tomoki Sato | Japan | | 3:41.70 | |
| 3rd place, bronze medalist(s) | 4 | 2231 | Pichaya Kurattanasiri | Thailand | | 3:53.96 | |
| 4 | 10 | 1745 | Hirokazu Ueyonabaru | Japan | | 3:54.04 | |
| 5 | 9 | 2380 | Steven Toyoji | United States | | 3:54.64 | |
| 6 | 5 | 1428 | Santiago Sanz | Spain | | 3:55.90 | |
| 7 | 3 | 1309 | Cristian Torres | Colombia | | 3:56.90 | |
| 8 | 1 | 1881 | Leonardo de Jesus Perez Juarez | Mexico | | 4:23.83 | |
| 9 | 2 | 2370 | Josh Roberts | United States | | 4:47.80 | |
| | 8 | 1737 | Akikazu Noda | Japan | | | DSQ |
