= Kiona-Benton City High School =

Kiona–Benton High School

Location
- 1205 Horne Drive, Benton City, Washington
- Coordinates: 46°16′11″N 119°29′23″W

Information
- Principal: Clay Henry
- Teaching staff: 21.60 (FTE)
- Enrollment: 447 (2023-2024)
- Student to teacher ratio: 20.69
- Color
- Mascot: Bear
- Website: www.kibesd.org/kbhs

Kiona–Benton High School is a public high school located in Benton City, Washington serving 497 students in grades 9–12.
