= Athletics at the 2016 Summer Paralympics – Women's 5000 metres T54 =

Women's 5000 metres T54 at the XV Paralympic Games
- Venue: Rio Olympic Stadium
- Dates: 14 and 15 September
- Competitors: 10

Medalists
1st place, gold medalist(s)		Tatyana McFadden	United States
2nd place, silver medalist(s)		Chelsea McClammer	United States
3rd place, bronze medalist(s)		Amanda McGrory	United States

The women's 5000 metres T54 event at the 2016 Summer Paralympics took place at the Rio Olympic Stadium on 14 and 15 September. It featured 14 athletes from 8 countries and was open to both T54 and T53 classification athletes. The United States took all three medals, while eventual winner Tatyana McFadden broke the Paralympic record during the heat stages.

The T54 category is for athletes with paraplegia, but have normal hand and arm function, limited to no trunk function, and no leg function. T53 athletes may have spinal injuries or cerebral palsy and have full use of their arms but have no or limited trunk function.

== Records ==
The existing world records were as follows.

Record Type	Event - class	time	Country	Venue	Date
World record	5000 m - T54	11:04.54	Tatyana McFadden (USA)	Arbon, Switzerland	6 June 2015
Paralympic record	5000 m - T54	11:59.51	Wakako Tsuchida (JPN)	Athens, Greece	21 September 2004

== Heats ==
The heats were completed at 10:00 and 10:17 local time. The first three athletes in each heat and the next four fastest advanced to the final.

=== Heat 1 ===
Rank	Athlete	Country	Time	Notes
1	Tatyana McFadden (T54)	United States	11:47.37	Q, PR
2	Manuela Schaer (T54)	Switzerland	12:00.47	Q
3	Ma Jing (T54)	China	12.53	Q, SB
4	Christie Dawes (T54)	Australia	12:15.95	
5	Aline Rocha (T54)	Brazil	12:16.03	
6	Margriet van den Broek (T54)	Netherlands	12:16.69	SB
7	Jade Jones (T54)	Great Britain	12:17.83	

=== Heat 2 ===
Rank	Athlete	Country	Time	Notes
1	Chelsea McClammer (T53)	United States	11:49.25	Q
2	Amanda McGrory (T54)	United States	11:49.47	Q
3	Zou Lihong (T54)	China	11:49.52	Q, PB
4	Madison de Rozario (T53)	Australia	11:49.71	q
5	Diane Roy (T54)	Canada	11:58.04	q
6	Gunilla Wallengren (T54)	Sweden	12:07.88	q
7	Maria de Fátima Fonseca Chaves (T54)	Brazil	12:08.52	q, PB

== Final ==
Rank	Athlete	Country	Time	Notes
1st place, gold medalist(s)	Tatyana McFadden	United States	11:54.07	
2nd place, silver medalist(s)	Chelsea McClammer	United States	11:54.33	
3rd place, bronze medalist(s)	Amanda McGrory	United States	11:54.34	
4	Madison de Rozario	Australia	11.54.46	
5	Zou Lihong	China	11.55.10	
6	Ma Jing	China	11.57.20	SB
7	Diane Roy	Canada	11:58.78	
8	Manuela Schaer	Switzerland	11:59.86	
9	Maria de Fátima Fonseca Chaves	Brazil	12:06.15	PB
10	Gunilla Wallengren	Sweden	12:20.15	
			Temperature: 25 C	
