= Christie Dawes =

Australian Paralympic athlete

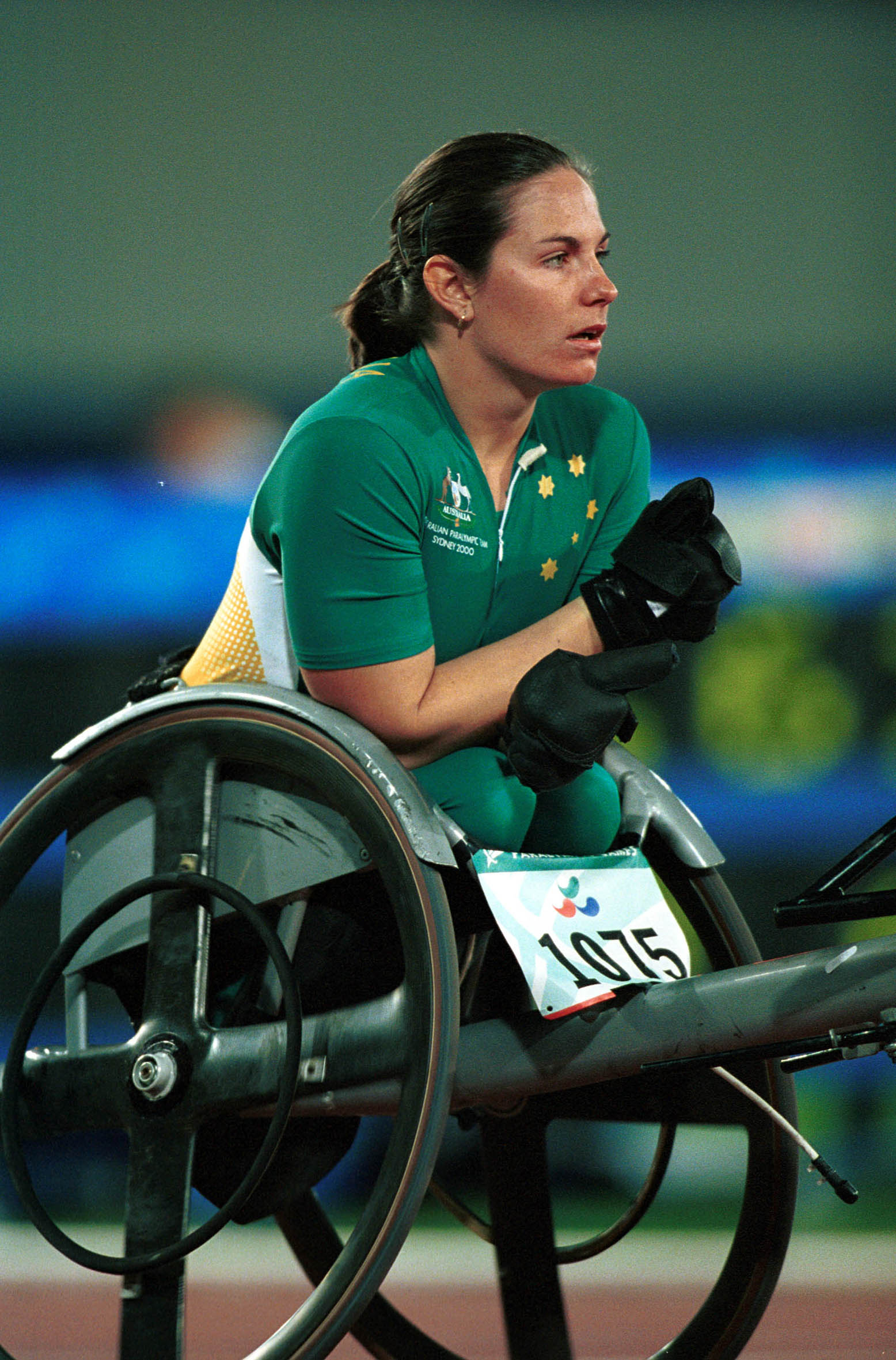
- Dawes pre race at the 2000 Summer Paralympics

Personal information
- Nationality: Australian
- Born: Christie Skelton; 3 May 1980 (age 46) Newcastle, New South Wales, Australia
- Height: 1.56 m (5 ft 1 in) (2008)
- Weight: 45 kg (99 lb) (2008)

Sport
- Country: Australia
- Sport: Wheelchair racing
- Events: 800 m, 1500 m and 5000 m, Marathon
Medal record
Wheelchair racing
Representing Australia
Paralympic Games
Silver medal – second place	2008 Beijing	Women's 4×100 m T53–T54
Silver medal – second place	2016 Rio	Women's 4×400 T53-54
Bronze medal – third place	2012 London	Women's 5000 m T54
IPC Athletics World Championships
Gold medal – first place	1998 Birmingham	Women's 4 × 100 T54-55
Gold medal – first place	1998 Birmingham	Women's 4 × 400 T54-55

Christie Dawes (née Skelton, born 3 May 1980) is an Australian Paralympic wheelchair racing athlete. She has won three medals in athletics at seven Paralympics from 1996 to 2021.

== Personal ==
When she was young, Dawes was very interested in athletics. At the age of 10, she was in a car accident. She survived, but became a paraplegic. Christie continued in her career in athletics, but also took up the job of a primary school teacher. She is married to her coach Andrew Dawes and their son was born in 2011.

== Athletics ==
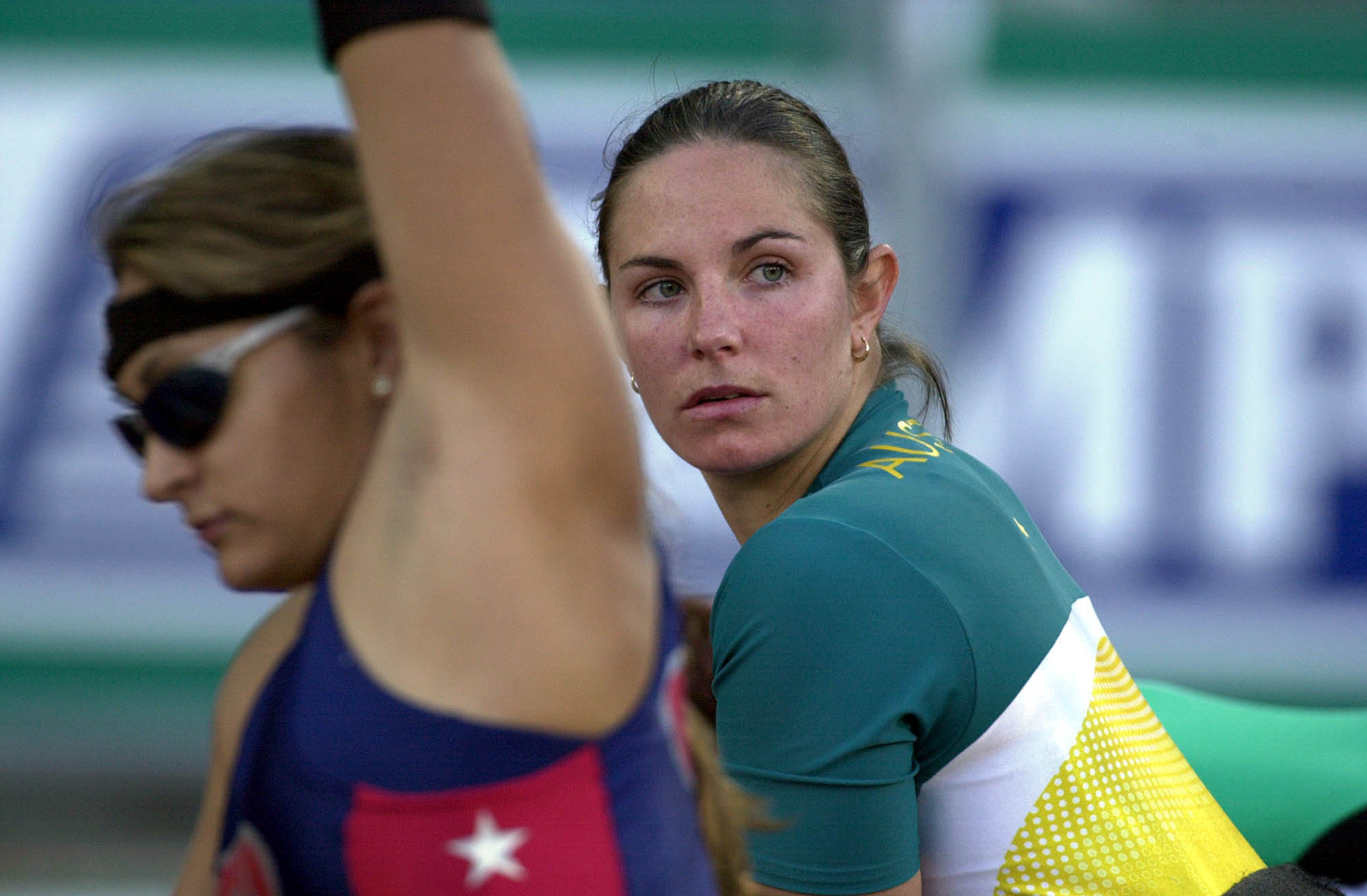
Dawes shown waiting at the 100 m semi final wheelchair race, 2000 Summer Paralympics. Cheri Beccera (USA) is seen in the foreground.

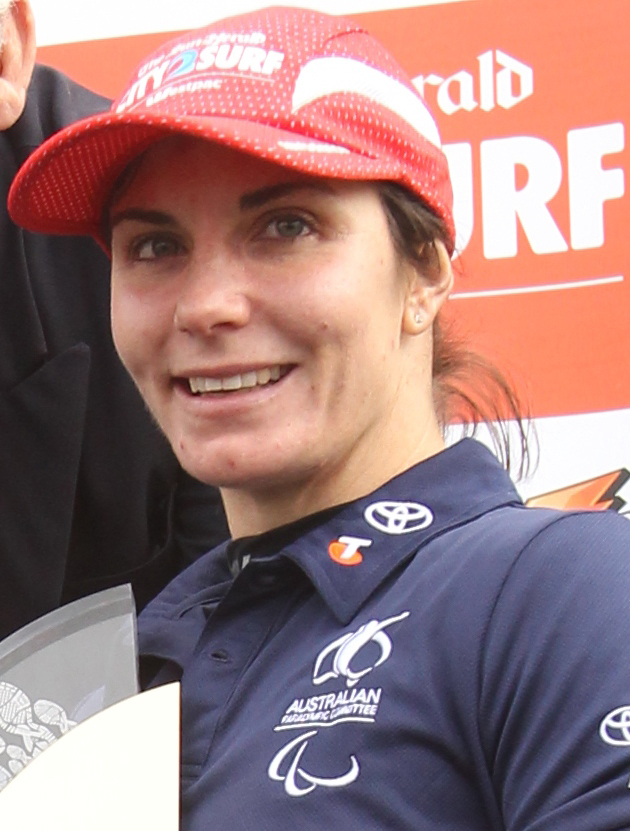
Photo of Dawes at City2Surf 2011, where she was the winner of the women's Wheelchair Division

In 1996, Dawes competed in the Atlanta Paralympics, where she was awarded the 1996 Young Paralympian of the Year Award.

Three years later, she won a bronze medal for the 10 km Peachtree Road Race. In 2000, she competed in the Sydney Paralympics.

Next was the 2004 Paralympics in Athens Paralympics, where she competed in 800 m, 1500 m, and 5000 m races and the Marathon. She also competed in the 800 m wheelchair demonstration event at the 2004 Athens Olympics.

She competed in the 2006 Melbourne Commonwealth Games, coming fifth in the Women's 800 m EAD T54 event.

Dawes competed in the 2008 Summer Paralympics in Beijing, and was one of several competitors caught up in a crash during the final of the women's 5000 m T54 wheelchair event, eventually finishing sixth despite a broken front wheel. The race was re-run, and Dawes spoke out against the treatment of Canadian athlete Diane Roy, who had been awarded the gold medal in the event, only to have it taken back and replaced with a silver medal when she finished second in the re-run. Dawes won a silver medal at the Women's 4x100 m T53/54 event at the Beijing games.

A few months after the games, she came third in the New York City Marathon. In January 2009, she won the Oz Day 10K Wheelchair Road Race. In February 2010, Dawes won the 10 km world wheelchair road race championships in the United Arab Emirates.

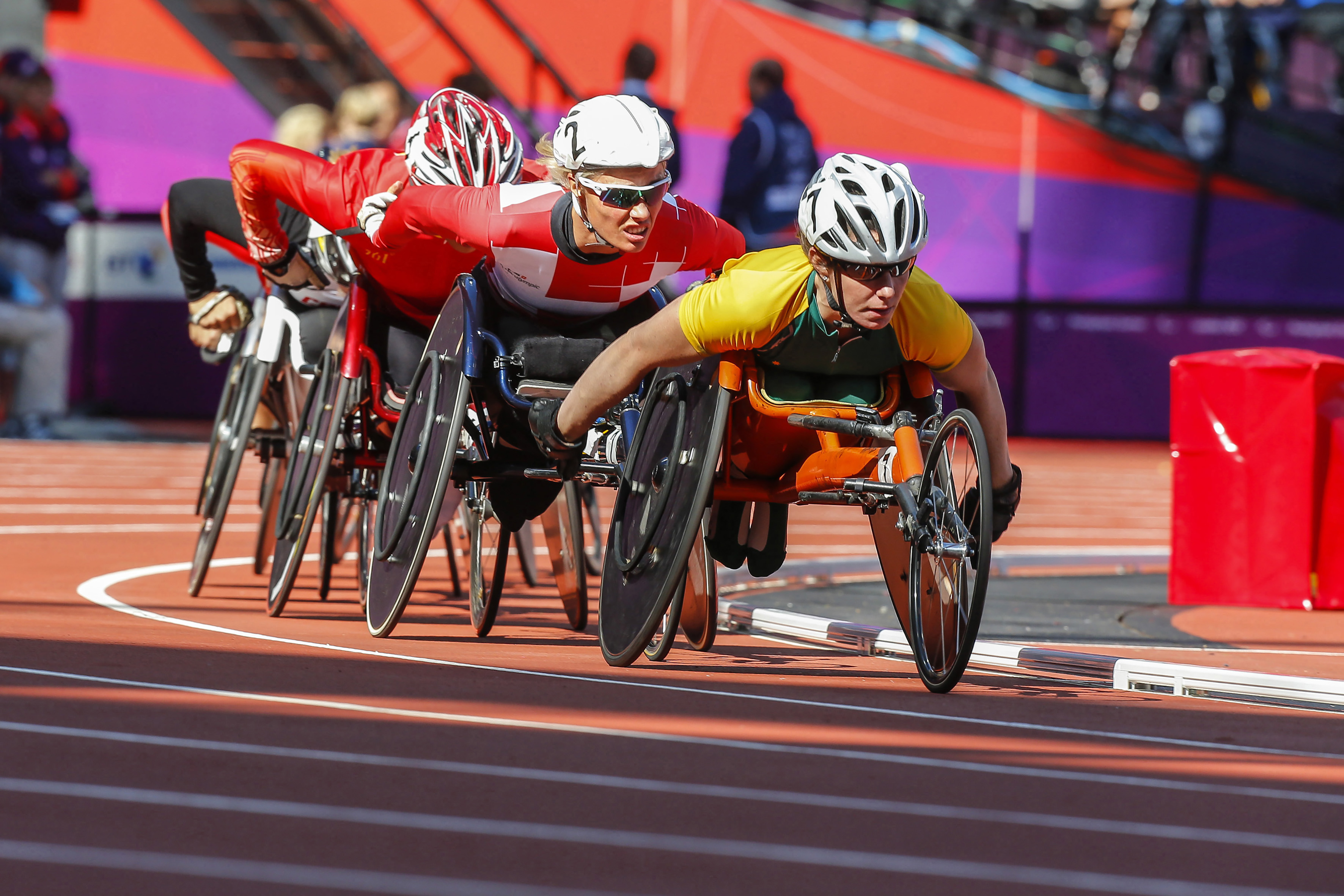
Dawes at the 2012 London Paralympics

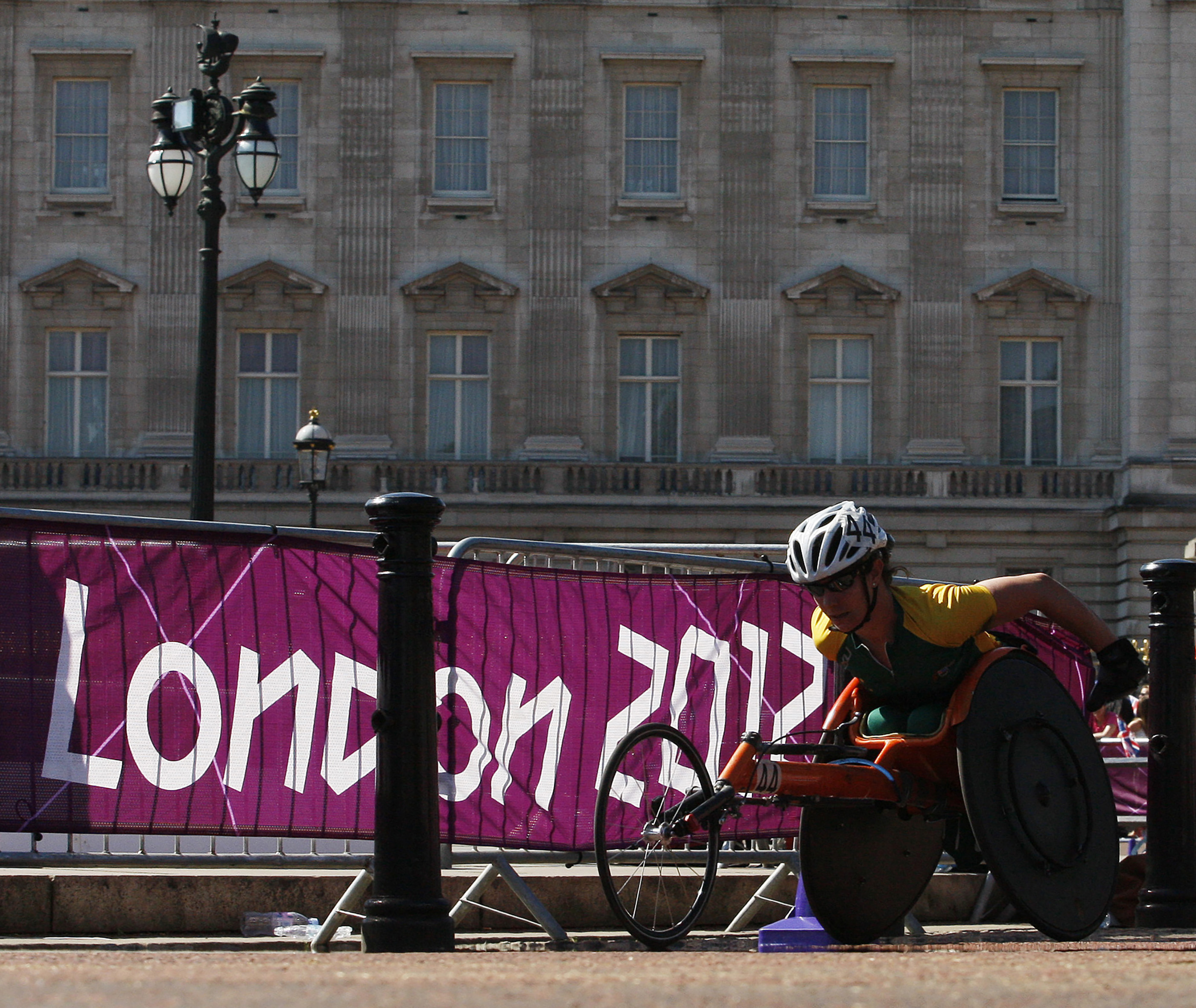
Dawes at the 2012 London Paralympics

After giving birth to her son in February 2011, she won three bronze medals at the 2011 National Titles in April. She then won a silver medal in the Chicago Marathon and came fourth in the New York City Marathon. At the 2012 London Paralympics, Dawes participated in the T54 class of the 800 m, 1500 m, 5000 m and marathon events.

She won a bronze medal in the T54 5000 m and finished sixth in the T54 marathon. At the 2014 Glasgow Commonwealth Games, she came fourth in the 1500 m T54.

At the 2016 Rio de Janeiro Paralympics, she competed in four events and medalled in one. Christie, Angie Ballard, Madison de Rozario and Jemima Moore placed 3rd in the 4 × 400 m relay but were disqualified, before successfully appealing the decision and being reinstated to 2nd. Her results in the 2016 Rio Olympics are as follows; 1500 m T54 placed 8th overall with a time of 3:26.00. 5000 m T54 she placed 11th in her heat with a time of 12:15.95 and did not advance to the finals. In the Marathon T54 she placed 7th overall with a time of 1:42:59.

Dawes then competed at the 2020 Tokyo Paralympics held in 2021, coming 8th in the Marathon T54.

At the 2022 Commonwealth Games, she finished 5th in the Women's Marathon T54.

Dawes announced that the Cape Town Marathon in South Africa in May 2026 would be her last professional race.
