= Kerry Morgan =

Welsh footballer

Personal information
- Date of birth: 31 October 1988 (age 37)
- Place of birth: Merthyr Tydfil, Wales
- Position: Winger

Team information
- Current team: Merthyr Town

Youth career
- Swansea City

Senior career*
Years	Team	Apps	(Gls)
2007–2011	Swansea City	3	(0)
2007	→ Östersunds FK (loan)	6	(0)
2007–2008	→ Port Talbot Town (loan)	11	(5)
2008	→ CF Balaguer (loan)	1	(0)
2008	→ Clevedon Town (loan)	8	(1)
2008–2009	→ Neath Athletic (loan)	30	(7)
2009–2010	→ Newport County (loan)	29	(6)
2010–2011	→ Newport County (loan)	40	(??)
2011	→ Newport County (loan)	0	(0)
2011–2012	Neath	0	(0)
2012–2013	Bath City	15	(2)
2013–2016	Merthyr Town	?	(24)
2016	Port Talbot Town		
2016–2017	Mangotsfield United	18	(2)
2017–2018	Cirencester Town	6	(1)
2018–	Merthyr Town		
2023–	→ Cinderford Town (loan)		
- * Club domestic league appearances and goals as of 13 March 2017 (UTC)

Kerry David Morgan (born 31 October 1988) is a Welsh footballer who plays as an attacking winger for Merthyr Town.

== Career ==
Morgan was born in Merthyr Tydfil, but came through the youth ranks at Swansea City. After signing his first professional deal in 2007, he was loaned out to Welsh Premier League neighbours Port Talbot Town, following a short spell in Sweden with the Swans' sister club Östersunds FK. He made a goalscoring debut for the Steelmen in the 5–1 win against Newtown on 25 August and in total went on to score nine goals in 15 league, League Cup and FAW Premier Cup appearances.

Morgan remained at Port Talbot until the New Year before being re-called by the Swans but on 3 January 2008 he was loaned out to Spanish Tercera División team CF Balaguer along with team-mate Chad Bond. His time in Catalonia with Swansea manager Roberto Martínez's former side was short and he returned to Swansea.

In March 2008 he was loaned out again, this time to Southern Football League Premier Division side Clevedon Town. Morgan again made a goalscoring debut, this time in the 1–1 draw with Yate Town and went on to make another seven appearances without scoring.

Morgan spent the entire 2007–08 season on loan at Neath Athletic in the Welsh Premier League and made 30 league appearances, scoring seven goals including a double against Prestatyn Town on S4C's featured match.

On 11 August, Morgan made his Swansea City debut in a 3–0 win over Brighton & Hove Albion in the League Cup. This was followed up by EFL Championship appearances in the 2010–11 season.

In October 2009 Morgan joined Newport County on a three-month loan deal. The loan was extended until the end of the 2009–10 season with Newport leading the Conference South table in December 2009 and Morgan went on to make a total of 29 league appearances as Newport were crowned Conference South champions with a record 103 points and promoted to the Conference National. In August 2010 Morgan rejoined Newport County on loan until 1 January 2011 and again on 13 January 2011 he joined Newport on loan until the end of the 2010–11 season. He was released by Swansea City at the end of the 2010–11 season.

In June 2011 he joined Neath.

Following the winding-up of Neath in the summer of 2012, Morgan joined Bath City. After a season with Bath, Morgan joined Southern League side Merthyr Town in June 2013. Morgan was a key part of the side which reached the play-offs in 2013-14 and then winning the league in 2014–15.

In January 2016 Morgan joined Southern League side Mangotsfield United.

In August 2023, he signed on loan for Cinderford Town in the Hellenic League from Merthyr Town for a three-month period.

== Honours ==
Newport County
Conference South Winner: 1
2009–10

Merthyr Town
Southern League Division One & South West Winner: 1
2014–2015
