= Ma Jing =

Chinese Paralympic athlete and cross-country skier

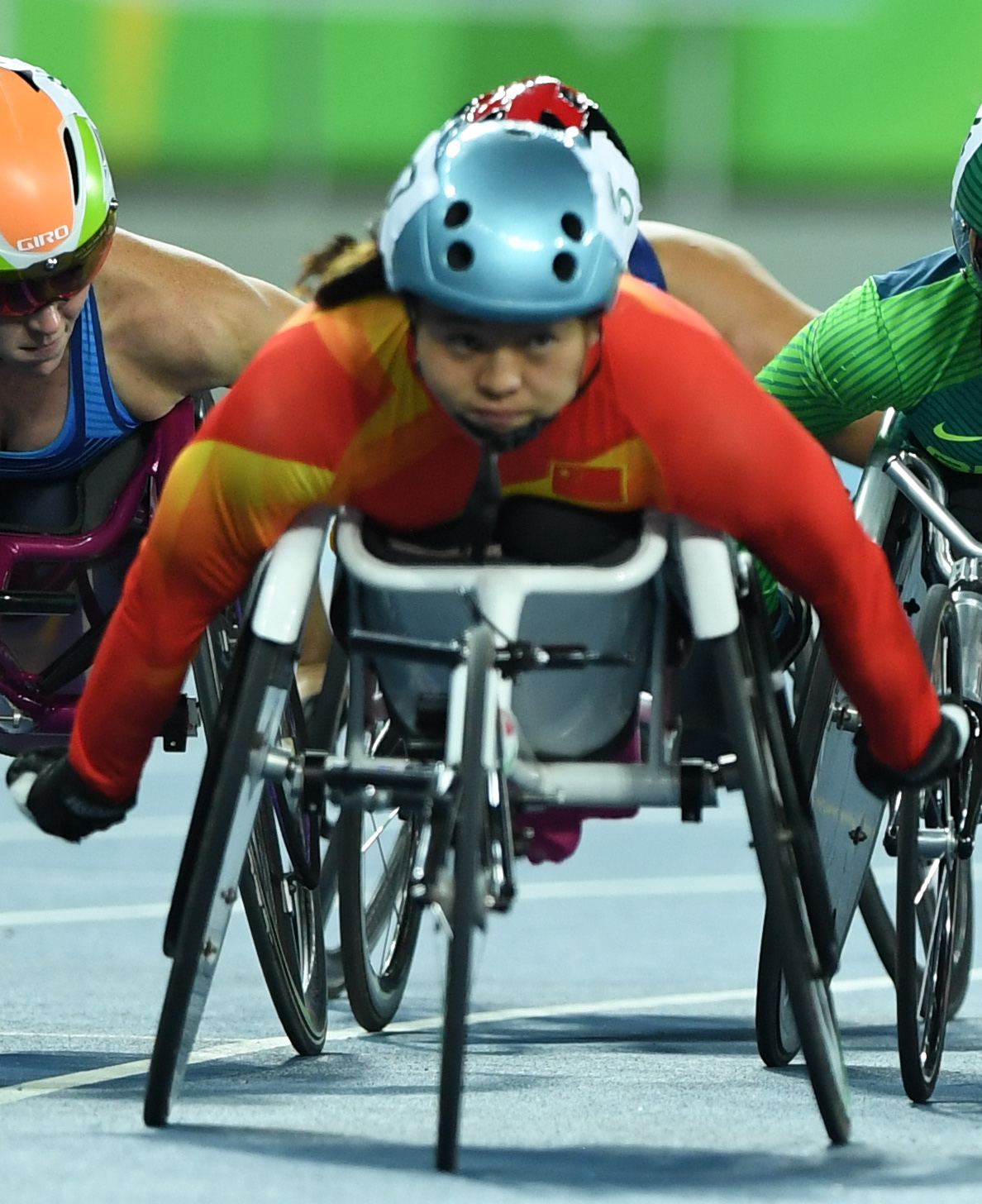
- Ma Jing at the 2016 Summer Paralympics

Personal information
- Born: 2 January 1988 (age 38) Shangluo, China

Sport
- Country: China
- Sport: Para-athletics; Cross-country skiing
- Disability class: T54
Medal record
Representing China
Paralympic Games
Women's para cross-country skiing
Bronze medal – third place	2022 Beijing	7.5 km sitting

Ma Jing (born 2 January 1988) is a Chinese Paralympic athlete and para cross-country skier.

== Career ==
Ma represented China at the 2016 Summer Paralympics and finished in sixth place in the 400 metres, and 5000 metres, and seventh place in the 1500 metres T54 events.

She represented China at the 2022 Winter Paralympics and won a bronze medal in the 7.5 kilometre sitting event.
