= Amanda McGrory =

American wheelchair athlete (born 1986)

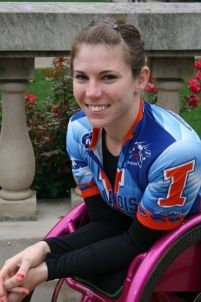
- McGrory in July 2010

Personal information
- Born: June 9, 1986 (age 40) Chester, Pennsylvania, U.S.
- Height: 1.52 m (5 ft 0 in)

Sport
- Sport: Wheelchair racing
- College team: University of Illinois – Wheelchair Basketball, Wheelchair Track and Field
Medal record
Track and field (T53/T54)
Representing United States
Paralympic Games
Gold medal – first place	2008 Beijing	5000m – T54
Silver medal – second place	2008 Beijing	Marathon – T54
Silver medal – second place	2016 Rio	1500m – T54
Bronze medal – third place	2008 Beijing	800m – T53
Bronze medal – third place	2008 Beijing	Women's 4 × 100 m relay – T53/T54
Bronze medal – third place	2016 Rio	5000m – T54
Bronze medal – third place	2016 Rio	Marathon – T54
IPC Athletics World Championships
Silver medal – second place	2017 London	1500m T54

Amanda McGrory (born June 9, 1986) is an American retired wheelchair athlete and current archivist for the United States Olympic & Paralympic Committee.

== Biography ==
McGrory graduated from Unionville High School in Kennett Square, Pennsylvania. She attended the University of Illinois, graduating in 2010 with a bachelor's degree in psychology and in 2018 with a masters in information science. While an undergraduate she competed both in basketball and in track and field.

McGrory earned four medals during the 2008 Summer Paralympics in Beijing, China: gold in the 5000 meters, silver in the marathon, and bronze in both the 800 meters and the 4×100 meter relay. She won both the 2009 London and 2006 New York Marathon wheelchair races.

She has also competed in the World Championships for Track and Field (2006, 2011, 2013, 2015, 2017) and Marathon (2015), winning 10 medals over the years (3 gold, 3 silver, 4 bronze).

McGrory was diagnosed with transverse myelitis when she was five years old, after an allergy shot inflamed her spinal cord. Such an occurrence was "I think there was one chance in six million", she said. "But I think it's usually better when you are young because kids are resilient. I couldn't ride a two-wheeler anymore, but my friends could still be outside. But I was the coolest kid in school because I had a wheelchair."

In 2021, I Love Libraries announced that she had started to work as the staff archivist for the United States Olympic & Paralympic Committee (USOPC).

== Selected results ==
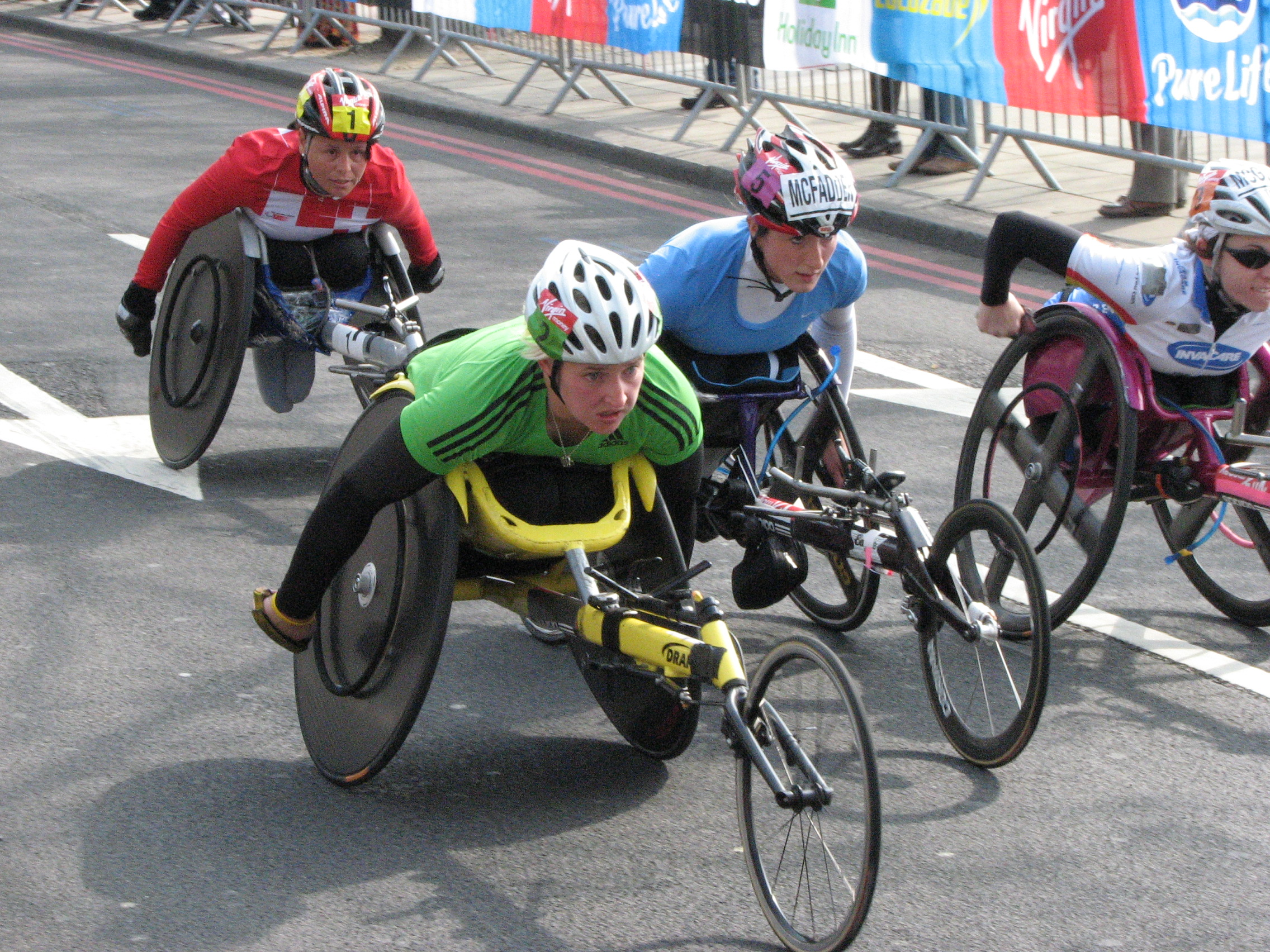
The women's wheelchair race at the 2011 London Marathon (left to right: Sandra Graf, Shelly Woods, Tatyana McFadden, and Amanda McGrory)

- 2011: First Place- New York City Marathon
- 2011: First Place- London Marathon
- 2009: First Place- London Marathon
- 2009: First place- Grandma's Marathon
- 2008: Gold medal, 5000m T54; silver medal, Marathon T54; bronze medal, 800m T53; bronze medal, Women's 4 × 100 m relay T53/T54 – Paralympic Games, Beijing, China
- 2007: First place (5000m), second place (400m), third place (800m) – Meet in the Heat, Atlanta, GA.
- 2007: Third place, 1500m – Boiling Point Wheelchair Track Classic, Windsor, Ontario, Canada
- 2007: Third place, 800m – U.S. Paralympics Track & Field National Championships, Atlanta, GA.
- 2007: First place – Open Women's Division of the Shepherd Center Wheelchair Division of the AJC Peachtree Road Race in Atlanta, Georgia with the time of 23:11:05.
- 2006: Gold medal (800m), silver medal (400m) – IPC Athletics World Championships, Assen, Netherlands
- 2006: First place – ING New York City Marathon, New York City, New York
- 2006: Visa Paralympic World Cup, Manchester, United Kingdom
- 2005: Represented the US at the Jr. Pan-Am Games in Windsor, Ontario
- 2003, 2004: Traveled to Australia as a member of the USA Jr. Team
- 2010 Los Angeles Marathon: 1:53:12, first
- 2012 Summer Paralympics
  - 800 m T53: 1:54.48, 7th
  - 1500 m T54: 3:38.19, 7th
  - 5000 m T54: 12:29.07, 7th
  - Marathon T54: 1:46:35, 4th
- 2013 Boston Marathon: 1:49:19, third
- 2016 Rio Paralympic Games, silver (1500m, 5000m), bronze (marathon), 4th (800m)
