= Chelsea McClammer =

American Paralympic athlete (born 1994)

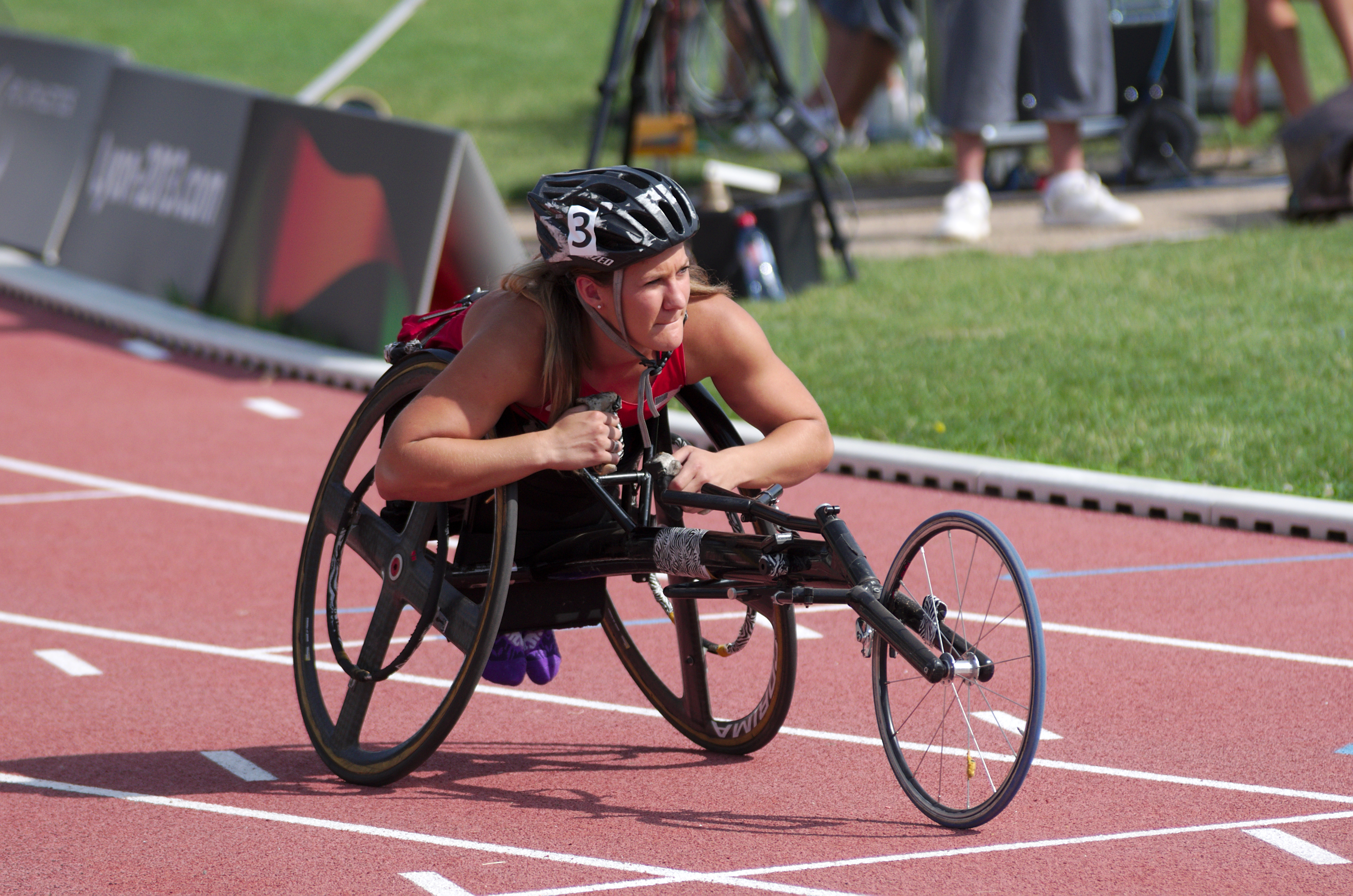
- McClammer in 2013

Personal information
- Born: March 1, 1994 (age 32) Benton City, Washington, United States
- Education: University of Illinois Urbana-Champaign
- Height: 1.65 m (5 ft 5 in)
- Weight: 45 kg (99 lb)

Sport
- Country: United States
- Sport: Paralympic athletics
- Disability: Paraplegia
- Disability class: T53
Medal record
Paralympic athletics
Representing United States
Paralympic Games
Silver medal – second place	2016 Rio de Janeiro	400m T53
Silver medal – second place	2016 Rio de Janeiro	5000m T54
Bronze medal – third place	2016 Rio de Janeiro	1500m T54
World Championships
Silver medal – second place	2017 London	400m T53
Bronze medal – third place	2013 Lyon	200m T53
Bronze medal – third place	2015 Doha	5000m T54
Bronze medal – third place	2017 London	800m T54
Bronze medal – third place	2017 London	5000m T54
Parapan American Games
Gold medal – first place	2011 Guadalajara	100m T53
Gold medal – first place	2011 Guadalajara	200m T53
Gold medal – first place	2011 Guadalajara	400m T53
Gold medal – first place	2011 Guadalajara	1500m T54
Gold medal – first place	2011 Guadalajara	5000m T54
Gold medal – first place	2015 Toronto	400m T53
Gold medal – first place	2015 Toronto	800m T53

Chelsea McClammer (born March 1, 1994) is an American Paralympic athlete with Team USA, she has won two silver medals and one bronze at the 2016 Summer Paralympics.

== Early life ==
McClammer played basketball, tennis and athletics as a child, but injured her spinal cord in a car accident when she was six years old and then she had to start with a wheelchair.

== Career ==
Chelsea McClammer started competing in wheelchair racing when she was a tween. She was introduced to wheelchair racing at a sports convention and hired coach Teresa Skinner to train her for competitive racing. With Skinner as her coach, McClammer qualified for the U.S. Paralympics Track and Field Nationals at the age of 12.

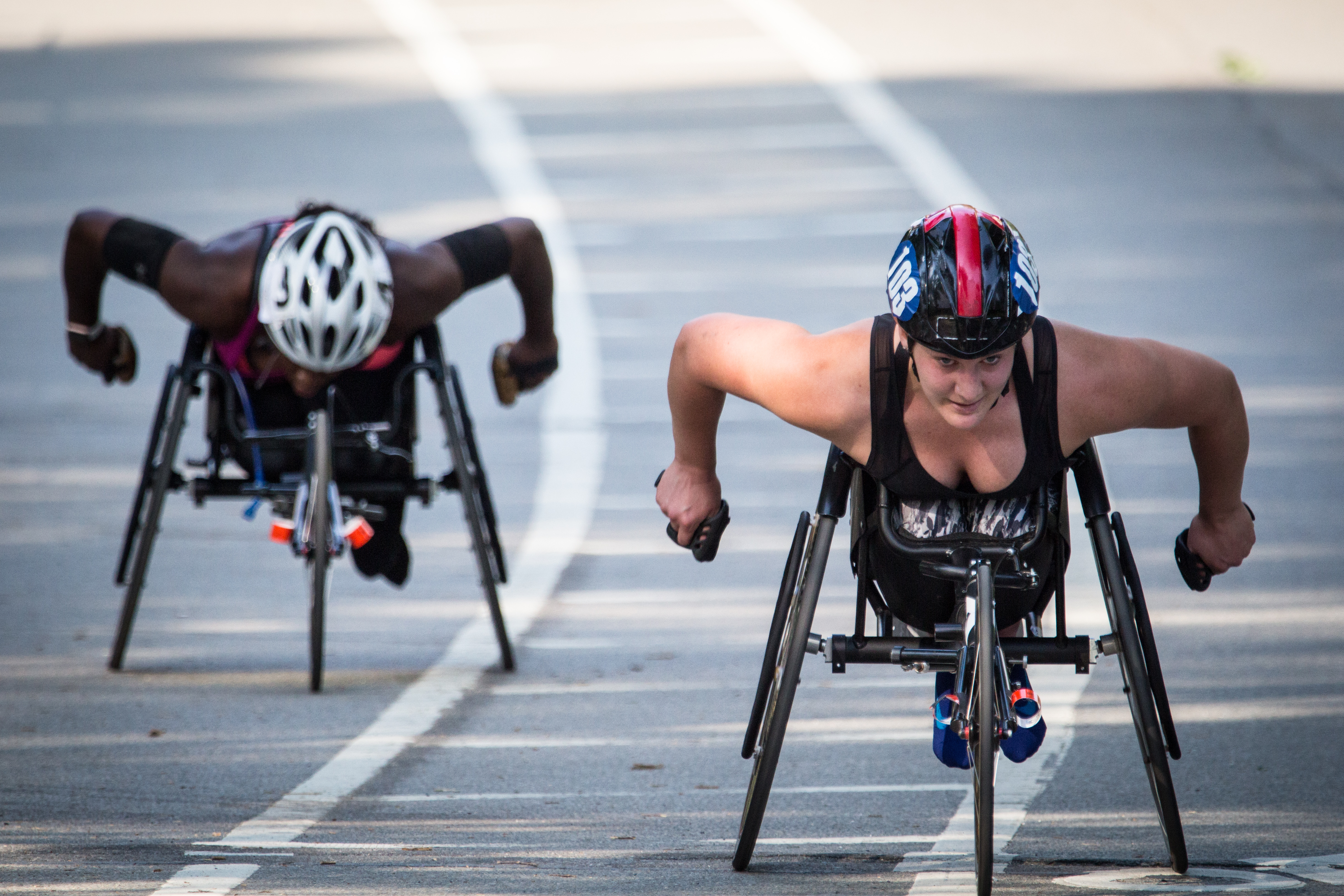
McClammer in 2018

As a freshman in high school, McClammer became the youngest member of Team USA in the 2008 Summer Paralympics in Beijing at 14 years old. In Beijing, McClammer qualified for the T54 finals and bested her personal record. She missed the first two weeks of school at Kiona-Benton City High School but upon her return, McClammer joined the school's cross country team. While competing with the team, she set a new state record with a time of 7:29 for 2.1 miles. However, after undergoing surgery for scoliosis, she competed in class T53.

In 2011, McClammer earned a bronze medal in the 800-meter race at the 2011 Parapan American Games in Guadalajara, Mexico. She also earned a gold medal with a time of 34.55 in the women's 200m T53, and another at the 100m. Upon graduating from high school, McClammer enrolled at the University of Illinois Urbana-Champaign.

As a student at the University of Illinois Urbana-Champaign, McClammer was named to Team USA's 2013 IPC Athletics World Championships team and competed in the women's 200 meters. McClammer won a bronze medal in the women's 200 meters T53 race with a time of 31.95. She later competed with Team USA at the 2015 IPC Athletics World Championships. She finished the competition placing fourth in the 800 T54 meter race.

In 2016, McClammer won two silver medals and one bronze in the women's 5,000 meters-T53/54, 4×400 relay-T53/54, and 1500 meter races at the 2016 Summer Paralympics. The next year, she competed with Team USA at the 2017 World Para Athletics Championships where she won a silver medal with a time of 55.50.

In 2019, McClammer tested positive for hydrochlorothiazide (HCTZ), a prohibited diuretic. USADA found that the HCTZ appeared as a trace contaminant in a permitted prescription drug, without McClammer's knowledge and without cause of negligence. As a result, she accepted a finding of no fault and was not disqualified from any past or future competitions.
