= Shirley Reilly =

American wheelchair racer (born 1985)

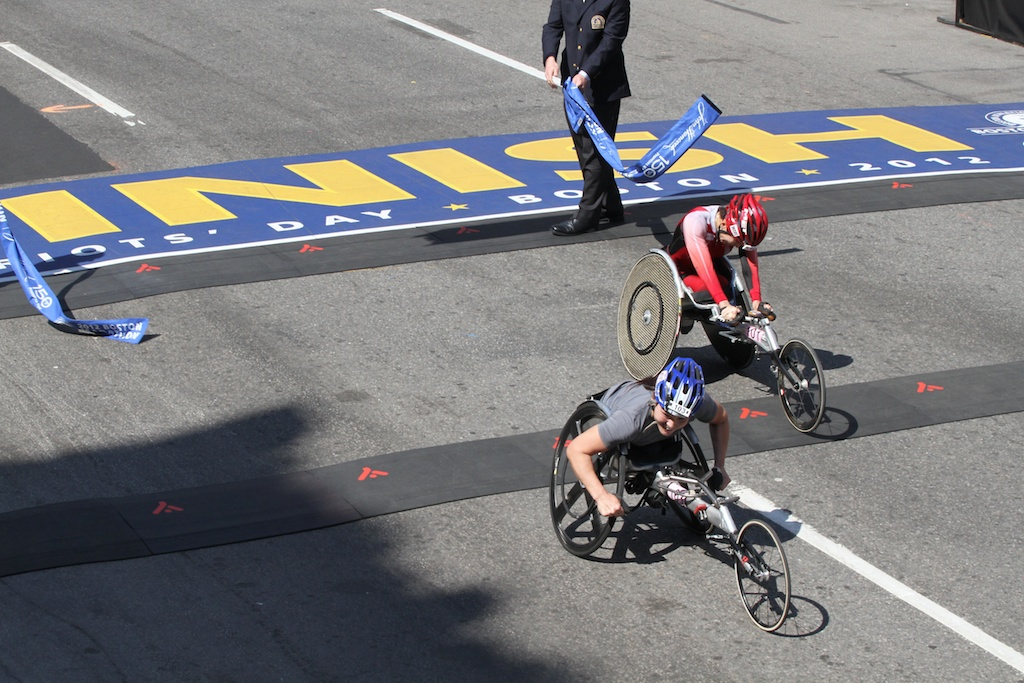
- Reilly beating Wakako Tsuchida to the 2012 Boston Marathon title

Personal information
- Full name: Shirley Reilly
- Nationality: American
- Born: May 29, 1985 (age 41) Anchorage, Alaska
- Height: 152 cm (5 ft 0 in)
- Weight: 47 kg (104 lb)
Medal record
Women's athletics
Representing United States
Paralympic Games
Gold medal – first place	2012 London	Marathon T54
Silver medal – second place	2012 London	5000 m T54
Bronze medal – third place	2012 London	1500 m T54
Parapan American Games
Silver medal – second place	2015 Toronto	400m T53
Silver medal – second place	2015 Toronto	800m T53

Shirley Reilly (born May 29, 1985) is an American wheelchair racer who competes in track races and the marathon distance in the T53/T54 categories. She has represented the United States at the Summer Paralympics in 2004, 2008 and 2012. She was the winner of the 2012 Boston Marathon race.

== Early life ==
Reilly was born in Anchorage, Alaska. She was paralyzed from the waist down at birth as she was delivered six weeks premature. Her early life was marked by frequent operations, including surgery around 1997 when she had eight spinal discs and two ribs removed.

== Career ==
She moved to California and graduated from a school in Los Gatos in 2003. Reilly took part in competitive sports at high school and focused on track athletics. She competed in the 2002 IWAS World Games and achieved her aim of participating in the Summer Paralympics at the 2004 Athens Games.

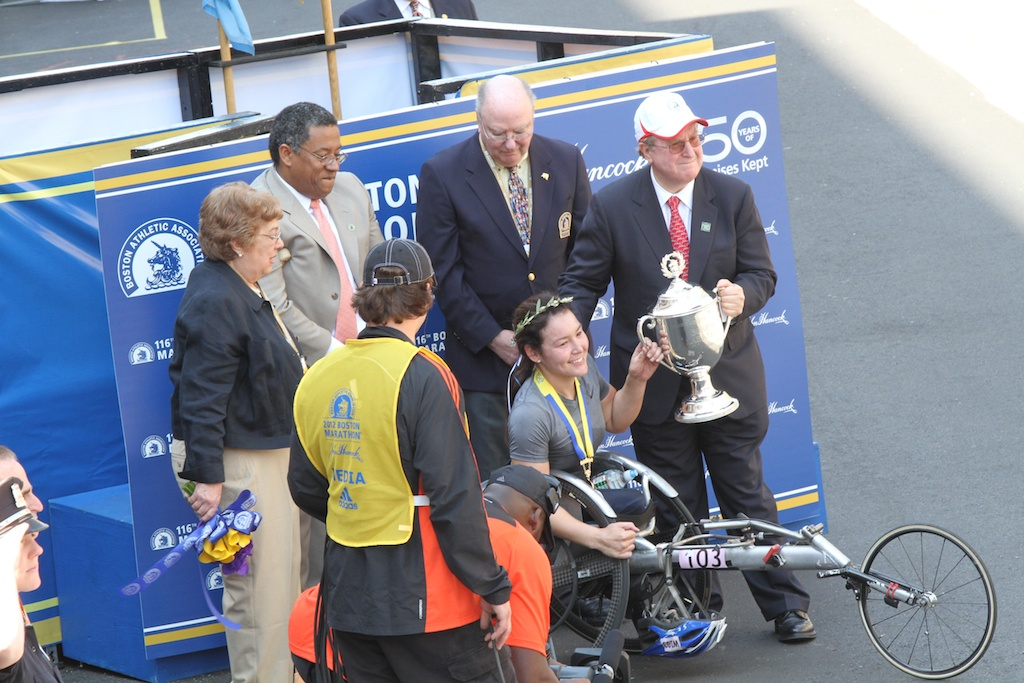
Reilly with the 2012 Boston Marathon winner's trophy

Reilly began to move towards road events thereafter, particularly the marathon. She was runner-up in the wheelchair section of the Los Angeles Marathon in 2005 and returned to following year to win the race. She became a regular performer at the Boston Marathon, coming fourth in 2005, improving to third in 2006, then taking fifth in 2007. She came fourth in the wheelchair race at the Peachtree 10K in 2008. In her second Paralympic appearance, she competed in the 1500 metres, 5000 metres and the marathon (finishing seventh in the latter event). The following year she was runner-up at the Gasparilla Distance Classic, and third at both the 2009 Boston Marathon and Grandma's Marathon. She debuted in the New York City Marathon in November and took seventh place.

She came in fourth at the 2010 Boston Marathon with a time of 1:57:23 hours and set a personal best of 1:41:01 hours at the 2011 race, finishing as runner-up behind Wakako Tsuchida. Reilly represented her country at the 2011 IPC Athletics World Championships. She defeated Tsuchida at the 2012 Boston Marathon, beating her at the line by a margin of one second to win the Boston Marathon title and set a best of 1:37:36 hours. Later that month she took part in the London Marathon for the first time and came in fourth after Canada's Diane Roy.

== Personal life ==
Reilly is of Iñupiat heritage.
