= Athletics at the 2020 Summer Paralympics – Women's 800 metres =

The Women's 800m athletics events for the 2020 Summer Paralympics took place at the Tokyo National Stadium from August 29 to September 4, 2021. A total of 3 events were contested over this distance.

== Schedule ==
R	Round 1	½	Semifinals	F	Final

Date	Sun 29		Mon 30		Tue 31		Wed 1		Thu 2		Fri 3		Sat 4	
Event	M	E	M	E	M	E	M	E	M	E	M	E	M	E
T34 800m													F	
T53 800m	R	F												
T54 800m	R	F												

== Medal summary ==
The following is a summary of the medals awarded across all 800 metres events.

Classification	Gold		Silver		Bronze	
T34	Hannah Cockroft; Great Britain	1:48.99 GR	Kare Adenegan; Great Britain	1:59.85	Alexa Halko; United States	2:02.22
T53	Madison de Rozario; Australia	1:45.99 GR	Zhou Hongzhuan; China	1:47.66	Catherine Debrunner; Switzerland	1:47.90
T54	Manuela Schär; Switzerland	1:42.81 GR	Tatyana McFadden; United States	1:43.16	Susannah Scaroni; United States	1:44.43

== Results ==
The following were the results of the finals only of each of the Women's 800 metres events in each of the classifications. Further details of each event, including where appropriate heats and semi finals results, are available on that event's dedicated page.

=== T34 ===
The T34 category is for wheelchair athletes with cerebral palsy. Athletes in this category have minimal limitations or control problems in their arms and trunk while pushing a wheelchair.

The final in this classification took place on 4 September 2021, at 9:46:

Rank	Lane	Name	Nationality	Time	Notes
1st place, gold medalist(s)	5	Hannah Cockroft	Great Britain	1:48.99	GR
2nd place, silver medalist(s)	3	Kare Adenegan	Great Britain	1:59.85	PB
3rd place, bronze medalist(s)	6	Alexa Halko	United States	2:02.22	SB
4	7	Fabienne André	Great Britain	2:09.09	PB
5	4	Veronika Doronina	RPC	2:19.64	SB
6	2	Eva Houston	United States	2:21.21	
7	8	Joyce Lefevre	Belgium	2:24.96	

=== T53 ===
The T53 category is for wheelchair athletes with normal use of arms and hands, no or limited trunk function, and no leg function.

The final in this classification took place on 29 August 2021, at 19:04:

Rank	Lane	Name	Nationality	Time	Notes
1st place, gold medalist(s)	5	Madison de Rozario	Australia	1:45.99	GR
2nd place, silver medalist(s)	7	Zhou Hongzhuan	China	1:47.66	SB
3rd place, bronze medalist(s)	8	Catherine Debrunner	Switzerland	1:47.90	
4	4	Samantha Kinghorn	Great Britain	1:47.94	SB
5	6	Hamide Doğangün	Turkey	1:48.94	PB
6	3	Chelsea McClammer	United States	1:51.19	SB
7	2	Angie Ballard	Australia	1:52.22	SB
8	9	Yen Hoang	United States	1:52.40	

=== T54 ===
The T54 category is for wheelchair athletes with no leg function, but near full arm function and reasonable to normal trunk function. Typically this may be caused by a lower spinal cord injury or spinal cord birth defect.

The final in this classification took place on 29 August 2021, at 19:17:

Rank	Lane	Name	Nationality	Time	Notes
1st place, gold medalist(s)	5	Manuela Schär	Switzerland	1:42.81	GR
2nd place, silver medalist(s)	4	Tatyana McFadden	United States	1:43.16	SB
3rd place, bronze medalist(s)	6	Susannah Scaroni	United States	1:44.43	SB
4	7	Merle Menje	Germany	1:46.43	
5	3	Mel Woods	Great Britain	1:50.40	PB
6	8	Amanda McGrory	United States	1:52.59	
7	2	Marie Alphonse	Mauritius	1:53.30	
8	9	Zübeyde Süpürgeci	Turkey	1:54.87	
