= Athletics at the 2016 Summer Paralympics – Women's 800 metres =

The Women's 800m athletics events for the 2016 Summer Paralympics take place at the Estádio Olímpico João Havelange from September 16 to September 17, 2016. A total of three events were contested over this distance for three different classifications.

== Schedule ==
R	Round 1	½	Semifinals	F	Final

Event↓/Date →	Thu 8	Fri 9	Sat 10	Sun 11	Mon 12	Tue 13	Wed 14	Thu 15	Fri 16	Sat 17
T34 800m									F	
T53 800m										F
T54 800m										F

== Medal summary ==
Classification	Gold		Silver		Bronze	
T34	Hannah Cockroft; Great Britain	2:00.62	Alexa Halko; United States	2:02.08	Kare Adenegan; Great Britain	2:02.47
T53	Zhou Hongzhuan; China	1:47.45	Madison de Rozario; Australia	1:47.64	Shirley Reilly; United States	1:47.77
T54	Tatyana McFadden; United States	1:44.73	Liu Wenjun; China	1:45.02	Li Yingjie; China	1:45.23

== Results ==
The following were the results of the finals of each of the Women's 800 metres events in each of the classifications. Further details of each event are available on that event's dedicated page.

=== T34 ===
The T34 category is for wheelchair athletes with cerebral palsy. Athletes in this category have minimal limitations or control problems in their arms and trunk while pushing a wheelchair.

18:11 16 September 2016:

Rank	Lane	Bib	Name	Nationality	Reaction	Time	Notes
1st place, gold medalist(s)	5	326	Hannah Cockroft	Great Britain		2:00.62	
2nd place, silver medalist(s)	6	897	Alexa Halko	United States		2:02.08	
3rd place, bronze medalist(s)	3	321	Kare Adenegan	Great Britain		2:02.47	
4	8	45	Rosemary Little	Australia		2:04.10	
5	7	341	Melissa Nicholls	Great Britain		2:13.59	
	4	619	Desiree Vranken	Netherlands			DSQ

=== T53 ===
The T53 category is for wheelchair athletes with normal use of arms and hands, no or limited trunk function, and no leg function.

17:46 17 September 2016:

Rank	Lane	Bib	Name	Nationality	Reaction	Time	Notes
1st place, gold medalist(s)	3	188	Hongzhuan Zhou	China		1:47.45	
2nd place, silver medalist(s)	2	36	Madison de Rozario	Australia		1:47.64	
3rd place, bronze medalist(s)	5	913	Shirley Reilly	United States		1:47.77	
4	4	30	Angela Ballard	Australia		1:47.97	
5	7	904	Chelsea McClammer	United States		1:48.32	
6	6	337	Samantha Kinghorn	Great Britain		1:49.51	
7	1	162	Lisha Huang	China		1:52.15	
8	8	849	Hamide Kurt	Turkey		1:52.78	

=== T54 ===
The T54 category is for wheelchair athletes with no leg function, but near full arm function and reasonable to normal trunk function. Typically this may be caused by a lower spinal cord injury or spinal cord birth defect.

17:53 17 September 2016:

Rank	Lane	Bib	Name	Nationality	Reaction	Time	Notes
1st place, gold medalist(s)	3	906	Tatyana McFadden	United States		1:44.73	
2nd place, silver medalist(s)	4	170	Wenjun Liu	China		1:45.02	
3rd place, bronze medalist(s)	8	167	Yingjie Li	China		1:45.23	
4	5	907	Amanda McGrory	United States		1:45.24	
5	6	780	Manuela Schaer	Switzerland		1:46.00	
6	7	190	Lihong Zou	China		1:46.18	
7	1	145	Diane Roy	Canada		1:51.51	
8	2	615	Margriet van den Broek	Netherlands		1:52.01	
