= Athletics at the 2020 Summer Paralympics – Women's 800 metres T34 =

Women's 800 metres T34 at the XVI Paralympic Games
- Venue: Tokyo National Stadium
- Dates: 4 September 2021 (final)
- Competitors: 7 from 4 nations
- Winning time: 1:48.99

Medalists
1st place, gold medalist(s)		Hannah Cockroft	Great Britain
2nd place, silver medalist(s)		Kare Adenegan	Great Britain
3rd place, bronze medalist(s)		Alexa Halko	United States

The women's 800 metres T34 event at the 2020 Summer Paralympics in Tokyo, took place on 4 September 2021.

The T34 category is for wheelchair athletes with cerebral palsy. Athletes in this category have minimal limitations or control problems in their arms and trunk while pushing a wheelchair.

== Records ==
Prior to the competition, the existing records were as follows:

World Record	Hannah Cockroft (GBR)	1:48.87	Arbon, Switzerland	24 May 2021
Paralympic Record	Hannah Cockroft (GBR)	2:00.62	Rio de Janeiro, Brazil	16 September 2016

Area	Time	Athlete	Nation
Africa	Vacant		
America	2:01.35	Alexa Halko	United States
Asia	2:18.98	Liu Panpan	China
Europe	1:48.87 WR	Hannah Cockroft	Great Britain
Oceania	2:04.10	Rosemary Little	Australia

== Results ==
The final took place on 4 September 2021, at 9:46:

Rank	Lane	Name	Nationality	Time	Notes
1st place, gold medalist(s)	5	Hannah Cockroft	Great Britain	1:48.99	GR
2nd place, silver medalist(s)	3	Kare Adenegan	Great Britain	1:59.85	PB
3rd place, bronze medalist(s)	6	Alexa Halko	United States	2:02.22	SB
4	7	Fabienne André	Great Britain	2:09.09	PB
5	4	Veronika Doronina	RPC	2:19.64	SB
6	2	Eva Houston	United States	2:21.21	
7	8	Joyce Lefevre	Belgium	2:24.96	
