= Athletics at the 2020 Summer Paralympics – Women's 100 metres T34 =

Women's 100 metres T34 at the XVI Paralympic Games
- Venue: Tokyo National Stadium
- Dates: 29 August 2021 (final)
- Competitors: 9 from 6 nations
- Winning time: 16.39

Medalists
1st place, gold medalist(s)		Hannah Cockroft	Great Britain
2nd place, silver medalist(s)		Kare Adenegan	Great Britain
3rd place, bronze medalist(s)		Robyn Lambird	Australia

The women's 100 metres T34 event at the 2020 Summer Paralympics in Tokyo took place on 29 August 2021.

The T34 category is for wheelchair athletes with cerebral palsy. Athletes in this category have minimal limitations or control problems in their arms and trunk while pushing a wheelchair.

== Records ==
Prior to the competition, the existing records were as follows:

World Record	Hannah Cockroft (GBR)	16.57	Arbon, Switzerland	22 May 2019
Paralympic Record	Hannah Cockroft (GBR)	17.42	Rio de Janeiro, Brazil	10 September 2016

Area	Time	Athlete	Nation
Africa	20.52	Yousra Ben Jemaa	Tunisia
America	18.43	Alexa Halko	United States
Asia	19.08	Noriko Arai	Japan
Europe	16.57 WR	Hannah Cockroft	Great Britain
Oceania	18.59	Rosemary Little	Australia

== Results ==
The final took place on 29 August 2021, at 10:25:

Rank	Lane	Name	Nationality	Time	Notes
1st place, gold medalist(s)	4	Hannah Cockroft	Great Britain	16.39	WR
2nd place, silver medalist(s)	5	Kare Adenegan	Great Britain	17.03	SB
3rd place, bronze medalist(s)	3	Robyn Lambird	Australia	18.68	SB
4	2	Veronika Doronina	RPC	19.06	PB
5	7	Fabienne André	Great Britain	19.14	
6	8	Alexa Halko	United States	19.57	
7	6	Joyce Lefevre	Belgium	19.63	
8	1	Eva Houston	United States	19.82	PB
9	9	Amy Siemons	Netherlands	20.29	
