= Athletics at the 2024 Summer Paralympics – Women's 100 metres T34 =

Women's 100 metres T34 at the XVII Paralympic Games
- Venue: Stade de France
- Dates: 1 September 2024
- Competitors: 10 from 4 nations
- Winning time: 16.80

Medalists
1st place, gold medalist(s)		Hannah Cockroft	Great Britain
2nd place, silver medalist(s)		Karé Adenegan	Great Britain
3rd place, bronze medalist(s)		Lan Hanyu	China

100 metres at the 2024 Summer Paralympics
Men · T11 · T12 · T13 · T34 · T35 · T36 · T37 · T38 · T44 · T47 · T51 · T52 · T53 · T54 · T63 · T64
Women · T11 · T12 · T13 · T34 · T35 · T36 · T37 · T38 · T47 · T53 · T54 · T63 · T64

The women's 100 metres T34 event at the 2024 Summer Paralympics in Paris, took place on 1 September 2024.

The T34 category is for wheelchair athletes with cerebral palsy. Athletes in this category have minimal limitations or control problems in their arms and trunk while pushing a wheelchair.

== Records ==
Prior to the competition, the existing records were as follows:

T33
World record	Shelby Watson (GBR)	19.89	(Switzerland) Nottwil	26 May 2016
Paralympic record	Kristen Messer (USA)	21.59	(United Kingdom) London	31 August 2012

Area	Time		Athlete	Location	Date
Africa	Vacant				
America	21.59	PR	(United States) Kristen Messer	(United Kingdom) London	31 August 2012
Asia	22.41	Record mark			
Europe	19.89	WR	(United Kingdom) Shelby Watson	(Switzerland) Nottwil	26 May 2016
Oceania	21.56	Record mark			

T34
World record	Hannah Cockroft (GBR)	16.31	(Switzerland) Nottwil	27 May 2023
Paralympic record	Hannah Cockroft (GBR)	16.39	(Japan) Tokyo	29 August 2021

Area	Time		Athlete	Location	Date
Africa	20.52		(Tunisia) Yousra Ben Jemaa	(United Kingdom) London	31 August 2012
America	18.43		(United States) Eva Houston	(Switzerland) Nottwil	8 June 2024
Asia	18.46		(Japan) Moe Onodera	(Switzerland) Nottwil	27 May 2023
Europe	16.31	WR	(United Kingdom) Hannah Cockroft	(Switzerland) Nottwil	27 May 2023
Oceania	18.59		(Australia) Rosemary Little	(Switzerland) Nottwil	30 May 2015

== Results ==
=== Round 1 ===
==== Heat 1 ====
First 3 in each heat (Q) and the next 2 fastest (q) advance to the Final.

Rank	Lane	Athlete	Nation	Time	Notes
1	4	Hannah Cockroft	Great Britain	17.12	Q
2	6	Fabienne André	Great Britain	19.03	Q
3	3	Moe Onodera	Japan	19.08	Q, SB
4	7	Panpan Liu	China	20.46	
5	5	Lauren Fields	United States	20.77	
Source:				Wind: +0.8 m/s	

==== Heat 2 ====
Rank	Lane	Athlete	Nation	Time	Notes
1	5	Karé Adenegan	Great Britain	17.87	Q
2	7	Lan Hanyu	China	18.73	Q, SB
3	4	Eva Houston	United States	19.09	Q
4	3	Haruka Kitaura	Japan	19.68	q, SB
5	6	Ayano Yoshida	Japan	20.43	q
Source:				Wind: -0.9 m/s	

=== Final ===
Rank	Lane	Athlete	Nation	Time	Notes
1st place, gold medalist(s)	6	Hannah Cockroft	Great Britain	16.80	
2nd place, silver medalist(s)	7	Karé Adenegan	Great Britain	17.99	
3rd place, bronze medalist(s)	5	Lan Hanyu	China	18.45	AR
4	8	Eva Houston	United States	18.65	
5	4	Fabienne André	Great Britain	18.86	
6	3	Moe Onodera	Japan	18.94	SB
7	2	Haruka Kitaura	Japan	19.81	
8	9	Ayano Yoshida	Japan	20.07	
Source:				Wind: +0.2 m/s	
