= 2017 World Para Athletics Championships – Women's 400 metres =

The women's 400 metres at the 2017 World Para Athletics Championships was held at the Olympic Stadium in London from 14 to 23 July.

== Medalists ==
Event	Gold		Silver		Bronze	
T11	Liu Cuiqing; Guide: Xu Donglin; China	58.51	Diana Coraza; Guide: Jorge Gasper Cerna; Mexico	59.11	Joanna Mazur; Guide: Michal Stawicki; Poland	1:01.94
T12	Omara Durand; Guide: Yuniol Kindelan; Cuba	52.75 CR	Melani Berges Gamez; Guide: Sergio Sanchez Palancar; Spain	57.68 SB	—	
T13	Leilia Adzhametova; Ukraine	56.58 PB	Sanaa Benhama; Morocco	56.66 PB	Carolina Duarte; Portugal	57.52 PB
T20	Breanna Clark; United States	56.33 WR	Barbara Niewiedział; Poland	59.56	Anais Maribel Lara Borja; Ecuador	59.70 PB
T34	Hannah Cockroft; Great Britain	58.29 WR	Alexa Halko; United States	59.93 AR	Kare Adenegan; Great Britain	1:02.94
T37	Georgina Hermitage; Great Britain	1:00.29 WR	Nataliia Kobzar; Ukraine	1:02.83 PB	Jiang Fenfen; China	1:04.35 PB
T38	Kadeena Cox; Great Britain	1:02.87	Yuka Takamatsu; Japan	1:08.32 PB	Torita Blake; Australia	1:09.24
T44	Irmgard Bensusan; Germany	1:02.33	Federica Maspero; Italy	1:03.00 CR	Sara Andres Barrio; Spain	1:03.08 PB
T52	Teruyo Tanaka; Japan	1:21.20	Yuka Kiyama; Japan	1:26.30	—	
T53	Zhou Hongzhuan; China	55.22 CR	Chelsea McClammer; United States	55.50	Samantha Kinghorn; Great Britain	55.71
T54	Tatyana McFadden; United States	53.74	Zou Lihong; China	54.53	Cheri Madsen; United States	55.05
WR world record | AR area record | CR championship record | GR games record | NR national record | OR Olympic record | PB personal best | SB season best | WL world leading (in a given season)

Events listed in pink were contested but no medals were awarded.

== See also ==
- List of IPC world records in athletics
