= Robyn Lambird =

Australian Paralympic athlete

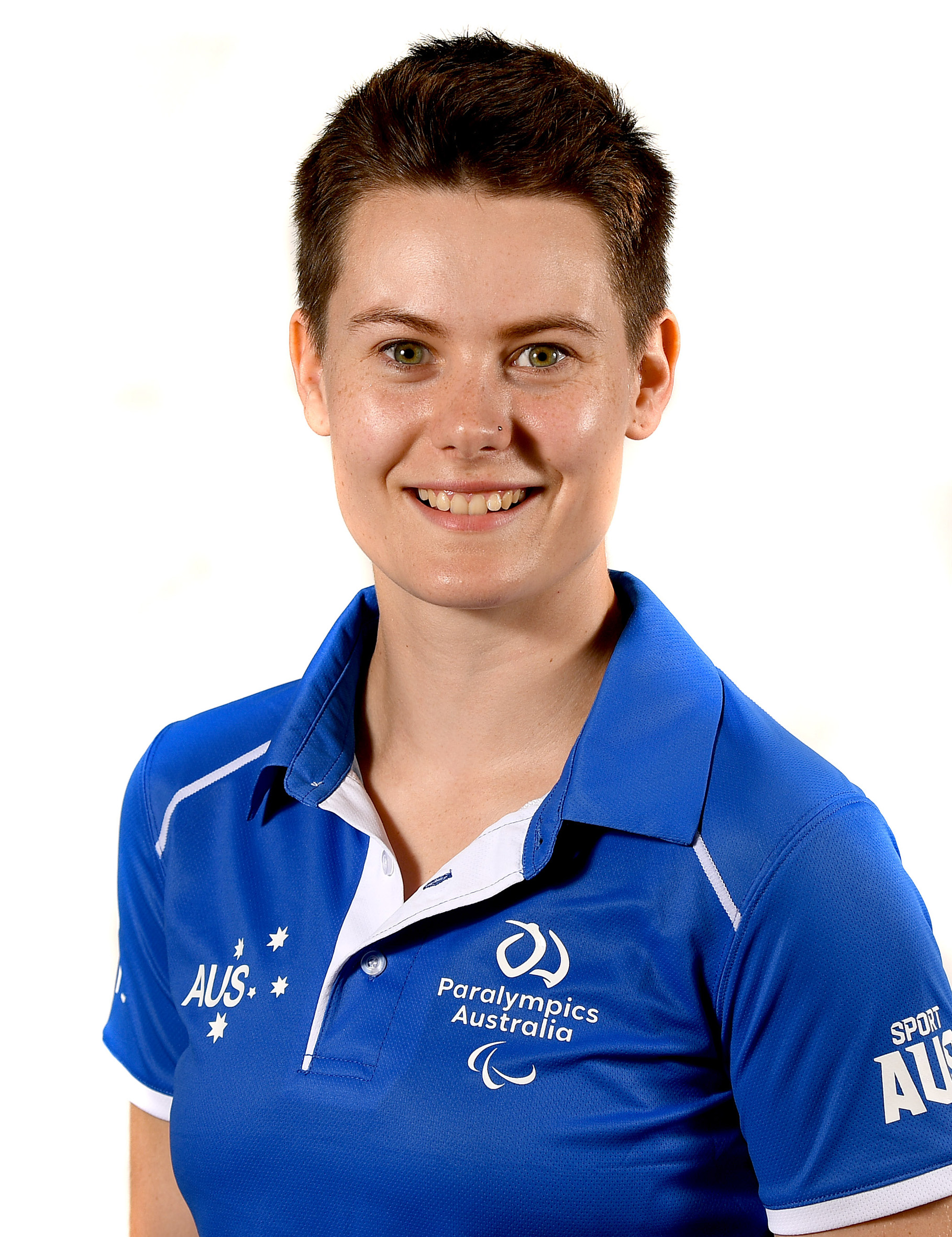
- Lambird in 2019

Personal information
- Nationality: Australian
- Born: 19 January 1997 (age 29) England

Sport
- Disability class: T34
- Coached by: Blanche Herbert
Medal record
Women's para athletics
Representing Australia
Paralympic Games
Bronze medal – third place	2020 Tokyo	100 m T34

Robyn Lambird (born 19 January 1997) is an English-born Australian wheelchair racer and model who has cerebral palsy. They won a bronze medal in the Women's 100m T34 at the 2020 Summer Paralympics, becoming the first out non-binary Paralympian to win a medal in addition to being among the first three out non-binary athletes to compete at the Paralympics.

== Early and personal life ==
Robyn Lambird was born on 19 January 1997. Robyn was born in England but moved to Perth, Western Australia at the age of nine. They were diagnosed with cerebral palsy at the age of nine and had surgery to lengthen their hamstrings and achilles tendons.

Lambird models and was the first person in a wheelchair to be featured in one of Target's active-wear campaigns. They have modelled for Tommy Hilfiger, Bonds, and ModiBodi.

Lambird is non-binary and uses they/them and she/her pronouns.

== Athletics career ==
Lambird is classified as T34. They played wheelchair rugby and wheelchair basketball before taking up Para-athletics in 2016. At the 2018 World Para-athletics Grand Prix in Nottwil, Switzerland, they placed second in the Women's 100m T34 and fourth in the Women's 200m T34.

At the 2019 World Para Athletics Championships, Lambird finished fifth in the Women's 100m T34. They won a bronze medal in the Women's 100m T34 at the 2020 Summer Paralympics with a time of 18.68 seconds, becoming the first out non-binary Paralympian to win a medal. They are among the first three out non-binary athletes to compete in the Paralympics, alongside Maz Strong and Laura Goodkind.

At the 2022 Commonwealth Games, they finished 4th in the Women's 100m T34.
