= Athletics at the 2016 Summer Paralympics – Women's 100 metres T34 =

Women's 100 metres T34 at the XV Paralympic Games
- Venue: Rio Olympic Stadium
- Dates: 10 and 11 September
- Competitors: 8

Medalists
1st place, gold medalist(s)		Hannah Cockroft	Great Britain
2nd place, silver medalist(s)		Kare Adenegan	Great Britain
3rd place, bronze medalist(s)		Alexa Halko	United States

The women's 100 metres T34 event at the 2016 Summer Paralympics took place at the Rio Olympic Stadium on 10 and 11 September. It featured 8 athletes and was held as a single straight final.

The T34 category is a wheelchair racing category, often for athletes with cerebral palsy. T33 athletes were also eligible to compete. In the event, all entrants were from the T34 category.

Defending champion Hannah Cockroft of Great Britain retained her title in a new Paralympic record, while compatriot 15 years old Kare Adenegan took silver on her Paralympic Games debut, pipping bronze medalist Alexa Halko from the United States.

== Final ==
Rank	Athlete	Country	Time	Notes
1st place, gold medalist(s)	Hannah Cockroft	Great Britain (GBR)	17.42	PR
2nd place, silver medalist(s)	Kare Adenegan	Great Britain (GBR)	18.29	
3rd place, bronze medalist(s)	Alexa Halko	United States (USA)	18.81	
4	Amy Siemons	Netherlands (NED)	18.82	
5	Rosemary Little	Australia (AUS)	19.05	
6	Carly Tait	Great Britain (GBR)	19.73	
7	Haruka Kitaura	Japan (JPN)	20.23	
8	Joyce Lefevre	Belgium (BEL)	21.02	
