= 2023 World Para Athletics Championships – Women's 800 metres =

The women's 800 metres at the 2023 World Para Athletics Championships were held across 3 classifications at Charlety Stadium, Paris, France, on 11 and 16 July.

== Medalists ==
Event	Gold	Silver	Bronze
T34	Hannah Cockroft; Great Britain	Karé Adenegan; Great Britain	Eva Houston; United States
T53	Catherine Debrunner; Switzerland	Samantha Kinghorn; Great Britain	Hamide Doğangün; Turkey
T54	Manuela Schär; Switzerland	Zhou Zhaoqian; China	Tatyana McFadden; United States

== T34 ==
The final of this event was held at 20:37 on 16 Jul 2023.

Rank	Lane	Name	Nationality	Time	Notes
1st place, gold medalist(s)	6	Hannah Cockroft	Great Britain	1:51.57	CR
2nd place, silver medalist(s)	3	Kare Adenegan	Great Britain	1:59.62	
3rd place, bronze medalist(s)	5	Eva Houston	United States	2:08.74	
4	4	Fabienne Andre	Great Britain	2:13.30	
5	8	Joyce Lefevre	Belgium	2:14.34	
6	7	Moe Onodera	Japan	2:16.86	
7	2	Sarah Clifton-Bligh	Australia	2:36.45	CR

== T53 ==
The event took place on 11 July.

Rank	Lane	Name	Nationality	Time	Notes
1st place, gold medalist(s)	6	Catherine Debrunner	Switzerland	1:38.89	CR
2nd place, silver medalist(s)	5	Samantha Kinghorn	Great Britain	1:44.98	
3rd place, bronze medalist(s)	4	Hamide Doğangün	Turkey	1:50.38	SB
4	7	Angie Ballard	Australia	1:57.23	
	3	Madison de Rozario	Australia	DNS	

== T54 ==
The event took place o1 11 July.

Rank	Lane	Name	Nationality	Time	Notes
1st place, gold medalist(s)	3	Manuela Schär	Switzerland	1:42.25	CR
2nd place, silver medalist(s)	7	Zhou Zhaoqian	China	1:46.46	PB
3rd place, bronze medalist(s)	5	Tatyana McFadden	United States	1:46.51	
4	2	Luo Shuimei	China	1:46.85	
5	6	Merle Menje	Germany	1:47.06	
6	8	Patricia Eachus	Switzerland	1:47.36	
7	1	Hannah Dederick	United States	1:47.70	PB
8	4	Tian Yajuan	China	1:47.72	
