= 2017 World Para Athletics Championships – Women's 800 metres =

The women's 800 metres at the 2017 World Para Athletics Championships was held at the Olympic Stadium in London from 14 to 23 July.

== Medalists ==
Event	Gold		Silver		Bronze	
T11	Diana Coraza; Guide: Jorge Gasper Cerna; Mexico	2:21.86	Joanna Mazur; Guide: Michal Stawicki; Poland	2:21.89	Maritza Arango Buitrago; Guide: Jonathan Sanchez Gonzalez; Colombia	2:22.60 SB
T20	Bernadett Biacsi; Hungary	2:20.51 CR	Anju Furuya; Japan	2:21.37 AR	Muhsine Gezer; Turkey	2:22.94 PB
T34	Hannah Cockroft; Great Britain	2:01.77 CR	Alexa Halko; United States	2:03.49	Kare Adenegan; Great Britain	2:05.76
T53	Zhou Hongzhuan; China	1:54.72	Madison de Rozario; Australia	1:54.88	Chelsea McClammer; United States	1:55.01
T54	Tatyana McFadden; United States	1:47.82 SB	Manuela Schär; Switzerland	1:49.47	Amanda McGrory; United States	1:49.64
WR world record | AR area record | CR championship record | GR games record | NR national record | OR Olympic record | PB personal best | SB season best | WL world leading (in a given season)

Events listed in pink were contested but no medals were awarded.

== See also ==
- List of IPC world records in athletics
