= Athletics at the 2016 Summer Paralympics – Women's 800 metres T34 =

Women's 800 metres T34 at the XV Paralympic Games
- Venue: Estádio Olímpico João Havelange
- Dates: 16 September 2016
- Competitors: 6 from 4 nations

Medalists
1st place, gold medalist(s)		Hannah Cockroft	Great Britain
2nd place, silver medalist(s)		Alexa Halko	United States
3rd place, bronze medalist(s)		Kare Adenegan	Great Britain

The T34 category is for wheelchair athletes with cerebral palsy. Athletes in this category have minimal limitations or control problems in their arms and trunk while pushing a wheelchair.

The Athletics at the 2016 Summer Paralympics – Women's 800 metres T34 event at the 2016 Paralympic Games took place on 16 September 2016, at the Estádio Olímpico João Havelange.

== Final ==
18:11 16 September 2016:

Rank	Lane	Bib	Name	Nationality	Reaction	Time	Notes
1st place, gold medalist(s)	5	326	Hannah Cockroft	Great Britain		2:00.62	
2nd place, silver medalist(s)	6	897	Alexa Halko	United States		2:02.08	
3rd place, bronze medalist(s)	3	321	Kare Adenegan	Great Britain		2:02.47	
4	8	45	Rosemary Little	Australia		2:04.10	
5	7	341	Melissa Nicholls	Great Britain		2:13.59	
	4	619	Desiree Vranken	Netherlands			DSQ
