= 2015 IPC Athletics World Championships – Women's 400 metres =

The women's 400 metres at the 2015 IPC Athletics World Championships was held at the Suheim Bin Hamad Stadium in Doha from 22–31 October.

== Medalists ==
Event	Gold		Silver		Bronze	
T11	Liu Cuiqing; Guide: Xu Donglin; China	56.68	Terezinha Guilhermina; Guide: Guilherme Soares de Santana; Brazil	58.52	Thalita Vitoria Simplicio da Silva; Guide: Felipe Veloso da Silva; Brazil	59.73
T12	Omara Durand; Guide: Yuniol Kindelan; Cuba	53.05 WR	Oxana Boturchuk; Guide: Oleksiy Ryemyen; Ukraine	54.92 PB	Edmilsa Governo; Guide: Fernando Lucas Mucuho; Mozambique	58.68
T13	Nantenin Keïta; France	56.63 SB	Somaya Bousaid; Tunisia	58.38 SB	Sanaa Benhama; Morocco	59.86
T20	Barbara Niewiedzial; Poland	57.78 PB	Natalia Iezlovetska; Ukraine	59.19 PB	Siti Noor Iasah Mohamad Ariffin; Malaysia	1:00.35 AR
T34	Hannah Cockroft; Great Britain	1:02.66 CR	Alexa Halko; United States	1:04.20	Kare Adenegan; Great Britain	1:04.78
T37	Georgina Hermitage; Great Britain	1:02.01 WR	Mandy Francois-Elie; France	1:05.55 PB	Evgeniya Trushnikova; Russia	1:07.16
T38	Margarita Goncharova; Russia	1:02.28 WR	Chen Junfei; China	1:03.65	Torita Isaac; Australia	1:06.06
T44	Marie-Amelie le Fur; France	59.30 WR	Irmgard Bensusan; Germany	1:03.27	Grace Norman; United States	1:03.83 AR
T47	Anrune Liebenberg; South Africa	56.65 SB	Yunidis Castillo (T46); Cuba	59.79	Alexandra Moguchaya (T46); Russia	1:01.50
T52	Marieke Vervoort; Belgium	1:08.40	Kerry Morgan; United States	1:12.55	—N/a	
T53	Angela Ballard; Australia	57.47	Zhou Hongzhuan; China	57.97	Huang Lisha; China	58.45
T54	Liu Wenjun; China	54.67 AR	Zou Lihong; China	55.73 PB	Margriet van den Broek; Netherlands	56.69
WR world record | AR area record | CR championship record | GR games record | NR national record | OR Olympic record | PB personal best | SB season best | WL world leading (in a given season)

== See also ==
- List of IPC world records in athletics
