= Gezer (surname) =

Gezer is a Turkish surname. Notable people with the surname include:

- Hüseyin Gezer (1920–2013), Turkish sculptor
- Muhsine Gezer (born 2003), Turkish female para-athlete
- Sultan Günal-Gezer (born 1961), Dutch female politician of Turkish descent
