= Eva Houston =

American Paralympic athlete

Personal information
- Born: January 24, 2001 (age 25) Council Bluffs, Iowa, U.S.
- Home town: Omaha, Nebraska, U.S.
- Education: University of Illinois Urbana-Champaign

Sport
- Sport: Para-athletics
- Disability: Cerebral palsy
- Disability class: T34
- Event: Wheelchair racing
Medal record
Para-athletics
Representing the United States
Paralympic Games
Bronze medal – third place	2024 Paris	800 m T34
World Championships
Bronze medal – third place	2023 Paris	800 m T34

Eva Houston (born January 24, 2001) is an American T34 wheelchair racer.

== Early life and education ==
Houston was born in Council Bluffs, Iowa, and raised in Omaha, Nebraska. She attended Westside High School in Omaha. She played wheelchair basketball for seven years before transitioning to wheelchair racing at 15 years old, during her freshman year of high school.

After high school, she attended the University of Illinois Urbana-Champaign, where she majored in natural resources and Environmental science. She chose the University of Illinois due to their wheelchair racing team. In 2023 she competed in the inaugural national collegiate wheelchair championships at the Drake Relays.

== Career ==
On June 24, 2021, Houston was selected to represent the United States at the 2020 Summer Paralympics. She competed in the 100 metres and 800 metres T34 events.

On May 21, 2023, she was selected to represent the United States at the 2023 World Para Athletics Championships. During her World Para Athletics Championships debut, she won a bronze medal in the 800 metres T34 event. She also competed in the 100 metres T34 and finished in fourth place with a personal best time of 19.28.

In July 2024, during the U.S. Paralympic team trials, she qualified to represent the United States at the 2024 Summer Paralympics.

== Personal life ==
Houston was born with cerebral palsy. Houston is queer.
