= Torita Blake =

Australian Paralympic athlete

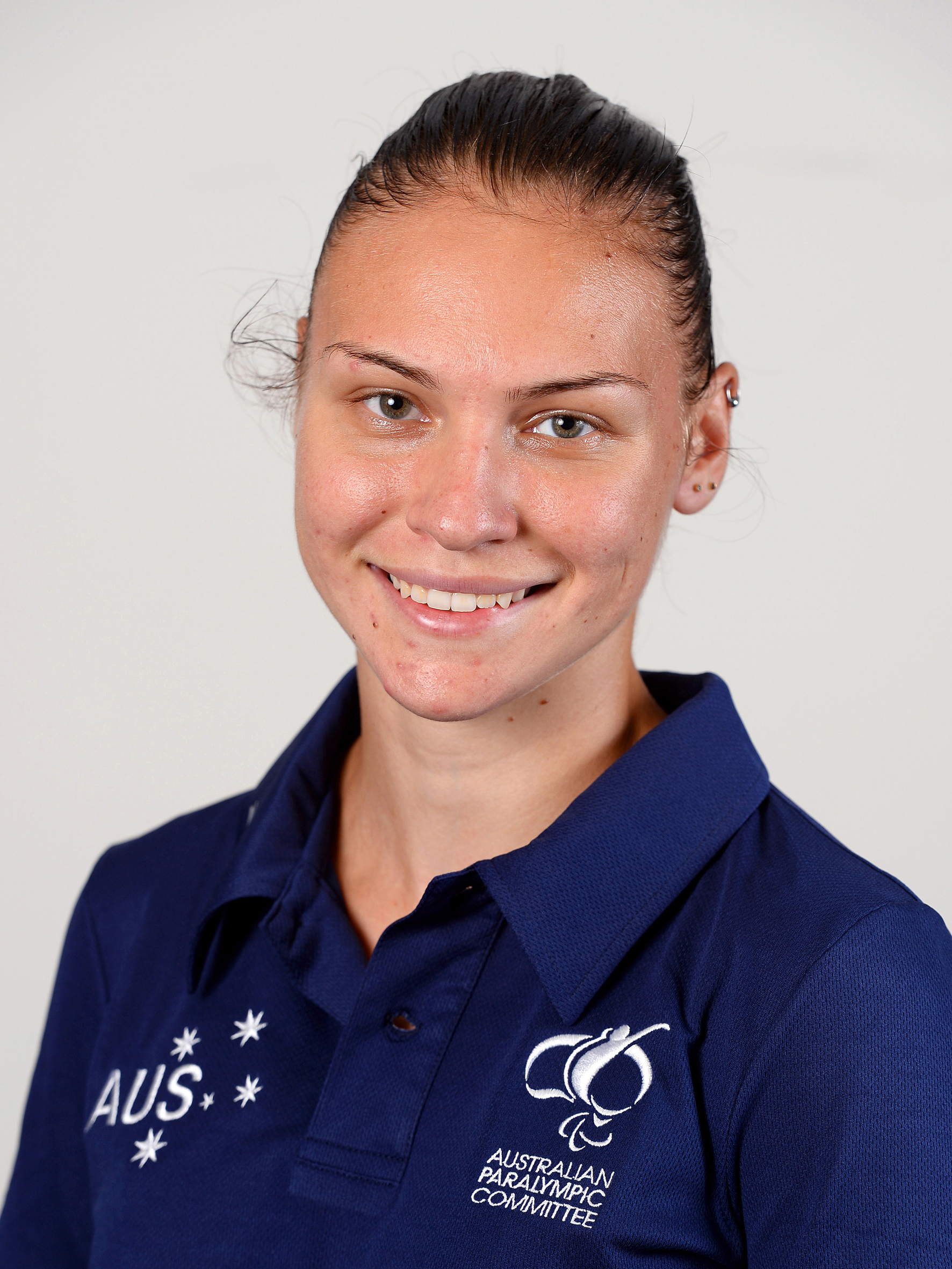
- 2016 Australian Paralympic team portrait of Isaac

Personal information
- Nationality: Australian
- Born: 5 July 1995 (age 31) Moree, New South Wales

Sport
- Country: Australia
- Sport: Paralympic athletics
- Club: University of Queensland
- Coached by: Wayne Leaver
Medal record
IPC Athletics World Championships
Bronze medal – third place	2015 Doha	400 m T38
Bronze medal – third place	2017 London	400 m T38

Torita Blake (born 5 July 1995) is an Indigenous Australian athlete. She represented Australia at the 2012 Summer Paralympics in athletics and won a bronze medal at the 2015 IPC Athletics World Championships. She represented Australia at the 2016 Rio Paralympics in athletics.

She competed as Torita Isaac up until 2016.

== Personal ==
Blake was born on 5 July 1995 in Moree, New South Wales. She is from Logan, Queensland. She was born with cerebral palsy, is blind in her right eye and has only 10% minimised vision in her left. She has fractured her legs eleven times. She has broken both arms falling off a horse. Blake is an Indigenous woman from the Dunghutti Aboriginal people.

Blake is an ambassador for the Raise the Bar Academy, a program run by Athletics Australia and Melbourne University, for indigenous secondary school students. She said "I've always wanted to inspire and show my heritage off. I'd like to be a mentor to indigenous kids and also kids with disability in sports. I want to represent Australia, but also my community and my culture. If I can show young indigenous kids you can do something, that nothing can stop you, then that's extra special for me."

== Athletics ==
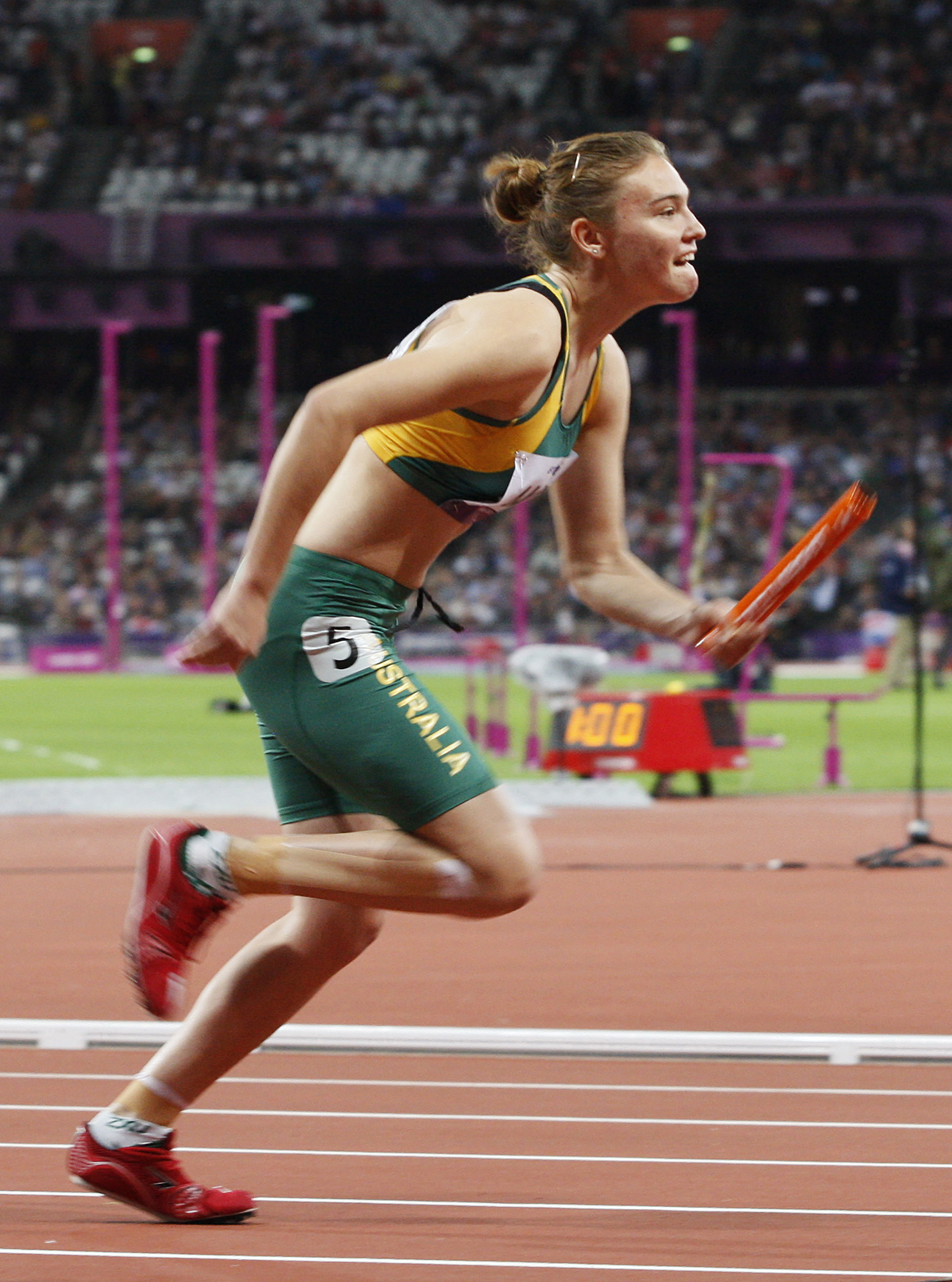
Isaac at the 2012 London Paralympics

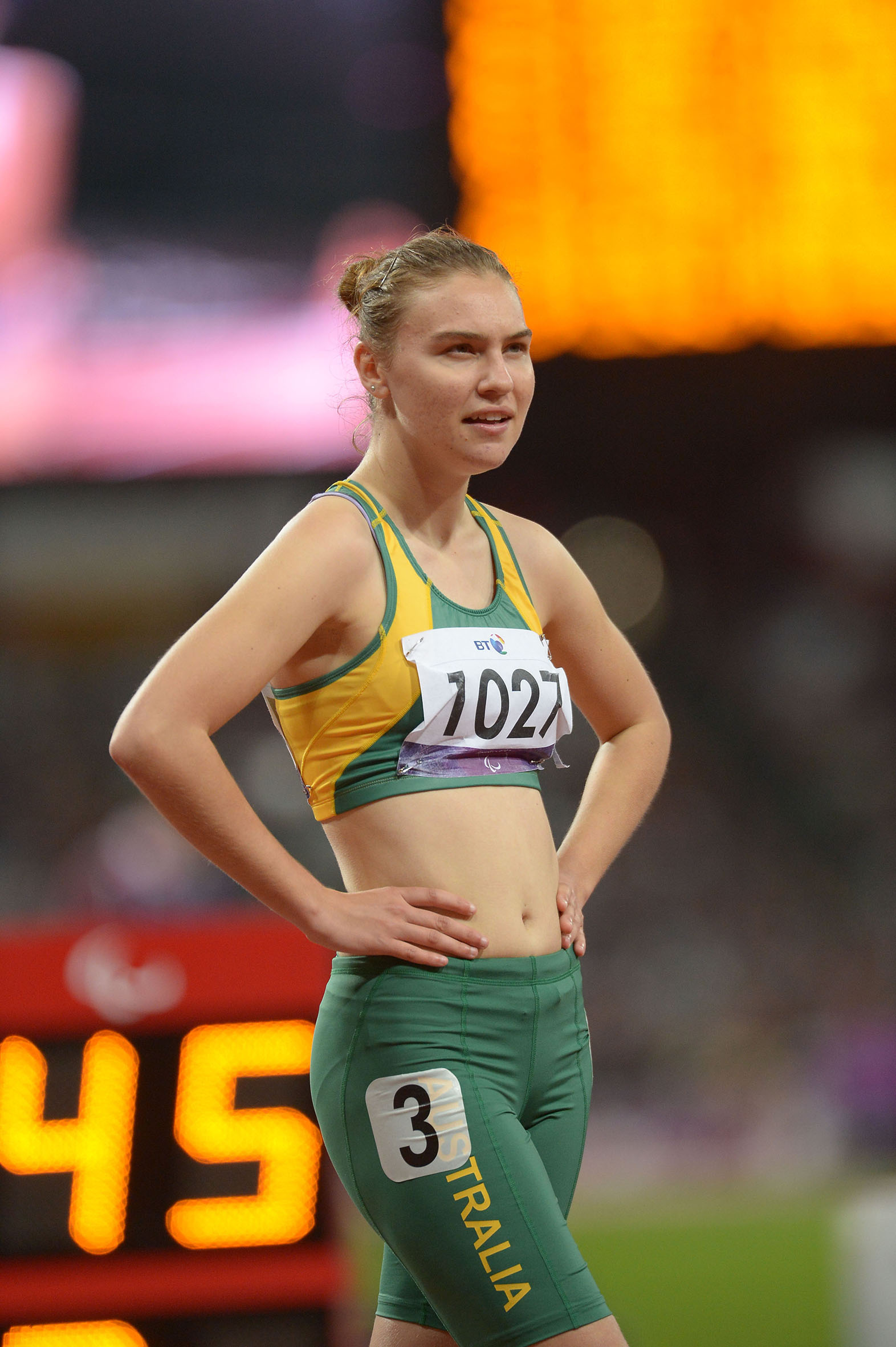
Isaac at the 2012 London Paralympics

Isaac first joined an athletics club in 2011, and specialises in sprints. She has been classified as a T13 before being reclassified to T38. She is a former member of Jimboomba Athletics Club.

Isaac competed in the 2012 Sydney Track Classic, 2012 Brisbane Track Classic and the 2012 Adelaide Track Classic. At the 2012 Summer Paralympics, she finished seventh in the 100 m T38, seventh in the 200 m T38 and fourth in the 4 × 100 m Relay T35-38event.

Competing at the 2013 IPC Athletics World Championships in Lyon, she finished seventh in both the Women's 100m and 200m T38. At the 2015 IPC Athletics World Championships in Doha, she won a bronze medal in the Women's 400m T38.

At the 2016 Rio Paralympics, her aim was to receive a podium finish although unfortunately missed out placing 4th overall in the 400 m T38 event with a time of 1:04.47

At the 2017 World Para Athletics Championships in London, England, she won a bronze medal in the Women's 400m T38 and finished seventh in the Women's 200m T38.

She is coached by Wayne Leaver in Brisbane.
