= Alexa Halko =

American Paralympic athlete (born 2000)

Personal information
- Born: June 28, 2000 (age 25) Midwest City, Oklahoma, U.S.
- Home town: Williamsburg, Virginia, U.S.
- Height: 5 ft 6 in (168 cm)

Sport
- Country: United States
- Sport: Para-athletics
- Disability class: T34
- Event: Sprint / middle distance
- Coached by: Drew Mearns

Achievements and titles
- Paralympic finals: 2016
Medal record
Women's para-athletics
Representing United States
Summer Paralympics
Silver medal – second place	2016 Rio	400 m – T34
Silver medal – second place	2016 Rio	800 m – T34
Bronze medal – third place	2016 Rio	100 m – T34
Bronze medal – third place	2020 Tokyo	800 m T34
IPC World Championships
Silver medal – second place	2015 Doha	100m - T34
Silver medal – second place	2015 Doha	400m - T34
Silver medal – second place	2015 Doha	800m - T34
Silver medal – second place	2017 London	400 m T34
Silver medal – second place	2017 London	800 m T34
Bronze medal – third place	2017 London	100 m T34

Alexa Halko (born June 28, 2000) is a parasport athlete from the United States competing mainly in T34 classification sprint and middle-distance events. She competed at the 2016 Summer Paralympics in Rio, where she won a bronze and two silver medals for her country, and followed this with a second bronze five years later at the Tokyo Paralympics.

== Personal history ==
Halko was born in Midwest City, Oklahoma, USA in 2000. Presently residing in Williamsburg, Virginia she attended Jamestown High School, graduating in 2018. Halko has cerebral palsy.

== Athletics career ==
Halko started out in parasports at the age of seven after being approached at a farmer's market by a member of the Greater Oklahoma Disabled Sports Association. She had never used a wheelchair prior but uses one to race. Classified as a T34 athlete, she entered her first senior competition in 2015, competing at a Grand Prix in Mesa, Arizona. That same year Halko was chosen to represent the United States at the 2015 IPC Athletics World Championships in Doha. She entered three events and won silver medals in two, the 100 metres and the 400 metres. In both she was beaten by Great Britain's Hannah Cockroft, the long-time dominant competitor in the women's T34 sprint events but with a time of 18.55 seconds in the 100 metres, Halko set a new North America record.

The following year she qualified for the 2016 Summer Paralympics in Rio, where at the age of 16 she was the youngest member of the American track and field team. In her first race, the 100 metres (T34) she edged out Amy Siemons of the Netherlands by one hundredth of a second to take the bronze medal. She took her second medal a few days later with a silver in the 400 metres (T34), splitting the British pairing of Cockroft (gold) and Kare Adenegan (bronze). Halko finished her first Paralympics with a second silver, finishing again behind Cockroft in the 800 metres (T34).

The following year Halko travelled to London to compete in her second World Championship, winning bronze in the 100 metres and silver in both the 400 metres and 800 metres.
