= Kare Adenegan =

British Paralympic athlete (born 2000)

Karé Adenegan
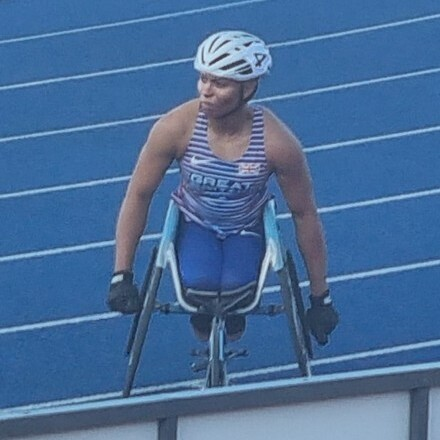
- Adenegan at the 2025 UK Athletics Championships

Personal information
- Born: 29 December 2000 (age 25) Coventry, United Kingdom

Sport
- Country: Great Britain
- Sport: Wheelchair racing
- Disability class: T34
- Event: 100 m 400 m 800 m 1500 m 4828 m
- Club: Coventry Godiva Harriers
- Coached by: Job King (club); Paula Dunn (national)
Medal record
Women's para athletics
Representing Great Britain
Paralympic Games
Silver medal – second place	2016 Rio	100 m T34
Silver medal – second place	2020 Tokyo	100 m T34
Silver medal – second place	2020 Tokyo	800 m T34
Silver medal – second place	2024 Paris	100 m T34
Silver medal – second place	2024 Paris	800 m T34
Bronze medal – third place	2016 Rio	400 m T34
Bronze medal – third place	2016 Rio	800 m T34
World Championships
Silver medal – second place	2017 London	100 m T34
Silver medal – second place	Dubai	100 m T34
Silver medal – second place	2019 Dubai	800 m T34
Silver medal – second place	2023 Paris	100 m T34
Silver medal – second place	2023 Paris	800 m T34
Silver medal – second place	2025 New Delhi	100 m T34
Silver medal – second place	2025 New Delhi	400 m T34
Silver medal – second place	2025 New Delhi	800 m T34
Bronze medal – third place	2015 Doha	400 m T34
Bronze medal – third place	2015 Doha	800 m T34
Bronze medal – third place	2017 London	400 m T34
Bronze medal – third place	2017 London	800 m T34
European Championships
Gold medal – first place	2018 Berlin	100 m T34
Silver medal – second place	2018 Berlin	800 m T34

Karé Adenegan (born 29 December 2000) is a British wheelchair athlete specialising in sprint distances in the T34 classification. She was classified as a disability athlete in 2013.

Competing for Great Britain at the 2016 Summer Paralympics, at the age of 15, she won a silver medal and two bronze medals. In 2018, Adenegan set a then New World record in the T34 100m at the Müller Anniversary Games in London, with a time of 16.80 seconds. Adenegan is one of the only T34 athletes to have completed the 100 metres in sub 17 seconds.

In 2018, she won the BBC Young Sports Personality of the Year Award.

== Early years ==
Adenegan was born in 2000 in Coventry, England and attended Bablake School. She now attends Warwick University. She has cerebral palsy.

== Athletics career ==
Adenegan took up wheelchair racing in 2012, after being inspired by the Summer Paralympics in London. At school she found herself excluded from sports due to her cerebral palsy, but the Games made her realize that sport was open to her. That year she joined a wheelchair academy in Coventry, and after becoming classified as a T34 athlete she began competing at national meets in 2013.

In September 2015 Adenegan managed a major sporting coup when at the Grand Prix final in London she became the first athlete to beat world record holder Hannah Cockroft in more than seven years. The two team-mates met again a month later when Adenegan as selected as the youngest member of the Great Britain team at the 2015 IPC Athletics World Championships in Doha. There she entered three events, the 100 metres, 400 metres and 800 metres, all in the T34 classification. Although just missing out on the 100m podium, after finishing fourth, Adenegan won her first major international medals of her career with bronze positions in both the 400m and 800m events. Both events were won by Cockroft.

Although she qualified for the 2016 IPC Athletics European Championships in Grosseto, Adenegan pulled out of the event to concentrate on her preparations for the 2016 Summer Paralympics in Rio de Janeiro. When the final Great Britain athletics squad was announced, Adenegan was elected for three events and was the youngest team member in the track and field squad.

At the 2016 Summer Paralympics, she won the silver medal in the 100m behind teammate Hannah Cockroft. She also won the bronze medal in both the 400 and 800m.

At the 2017 World Para Athletics Championships Karé won a silver in the 100m and two bronzes is in the 400 and 800m, repeating her results from Rio 2016.

In 2018 aged 17, Adenegan broke the T34, women's 100 metres world record at the London Muller Anniversary Diamond League defeating Hannah Cockroft by half a second. Adenegan's placed a time of 16:80 seconds making her the only T34 athlete to have gone under 17 seconds in the history of the sport.

In August 2018, at the Para World European Athletics Championships in Berlin, Adenegan defeated Cockroft in the T34 100 metres for the second time in the season, also setting a championship record of 17:34 seconds ( Cockroft finished in 17:95 seconds). Adenegan got her first gold medal in senior competition and a silver in the 800 metres in the same competition.

At the 2019 World Para Athletics Championships she won a silver medal in both the 100 and 800 metres.

In June 2021 she was among the first dozen athletes chosen to represent the UK at the postponed 2020 Paralympics in Tokyo, where she won silver medals in the 100 metres and 800 metre competitions.

At the 2022 Commonwealth Games she won a silver medal in the T34 100m.

At the 2023 World Para Athletics Championships she won a silver medal in both the 100m and 800m.

Kare was selected to compete at the 2024 Summer Paralympics. There she won a silver medal in both the 100 and 800 metres, behind teammate Hannah Cockroft.

At the 2025 World Para Athletics Championships in New Delhi, Adenegan claimed three silver medals in the T34 classification, finishing second to Hannah Cockroft in the 100 m, 400 m and 800 m events.

== Personal life ==
Adenegan is a Christian. She is a member of the Christians in Sport organisation.
