= Muhsine Gezer =

Turkish para-athlete (born 2003)

Personal information
- Born: 1 April 2003 (age 23) Burhaniye, Balıkesir, Turkey

Sport
- Country: Turkey
- Sport: Para-Athletics
- Disability class: T20
- Event(s): Triple jump, 400 m, 800 m, 1500 m
Medal record
Track and field
Representing Turkey
World Para Athletics Championships
Bronze medal – third place	2017 London	800 m T20
INAS European Championships
Bronze medal – third place	2016 Ankara	Triple jump
Gold medal – first place	2016 Ankara	800 m
INAS World Indoor Championships
Silver medal – second place	2018 Val-de-Reuil	800 m
Gold medal – first place	2018 Val-de-Reuil	1500 m
INAS European Indoor Championships
Silver medal – second place	2019 Istanbul	800m II1
Silver medal – second place	2019 Istanbul	1500m II1
Gold medal – first place	2019 Istanbul	4 x 200m relay II1
Silver medal – second place	2019 Istanbul	4 x 400m relay II1
World Para Athletics Junior Championships
Gold medal – first place	2019 Nottwil	1500m T20 (U18)
Gold medal – first place	2017 Nottwil	400m T20 (U18)

Muhsine Gezer (born 1 April 2003) is a Turkish female para-athlete competing in the T20 disability class of mainly middle-distance events 800 m and 1500 m.

== Private life ==
Muhsine Gezer was born in Burhaniye district of Balıkesir on 1 April 2003.

== Sports career ==
Gezer competed in the triple jump, 800 m, 100 m hurdles and 4 × 400 m relay events at the 2016 INAS European Athletics Championships held in Ankara, Turkey, and took the bronze medal in triple jump and the gold medal in 800 m.

She won the bronze medal in the 800 m T20 event at the 2017 World Para Athletics Championships held in London, United Kingdom. The same year, she captured the gold medal in the 400 m event at the World Para Athletics Junior Championships in Nottwil, Switzerland.

Gezer took the silver medal in the 800 m event, and captured the gold medal in 1500 m event at the 2018 INAS Indoor Athletics Championships in Val-de-Reuil, France.

In 2019, she won a gold medal in the II1 category of the 4 × 200 m relay II1 event and three silver medals in the 800 m, 1500 m and 4 x 400 relay events at the INAS Open European Athletics Championships in Istanbul, Turkey. She became world champion in the 1500 m T20 (U18) event at the 2019 World Para Athletics Junior Championships in Nottwil, Switzerland.

== Achievements ==
Year	Competition	Place	!Event	Result	Notes
2016	INAS European Athletics Championships	Turkey, Ankara	Triple jump	3rd place, bronze medalist(s)	9.26 m
2016	INAS European Athletics Championships	Turkey, Ankara	800 m	1st place, gold medalist(s)	2:27.02
2016	INAS European Athletics Championships	Turkey, Ankara	100 m hurdles	4th	34.97
2016	INAS European Athletics Championships	Turkey, Ankara	4 × 400 m relay	DQ	
2017	World Para Athletics Championships	United Kingdom, London	800 m T20	3rd place, bronze medalist(s)	2:22.94; PB
2017	World Para Athletics Junior Championships	Switzerland, Nottwil	400 m T20 (U18)	1st place, gold medalist(s)	1:02
2018	INAS World Indoor Athletics Championships	France, Val-de-Reuil	800 m	2nd place, silver medalist(s)	2:29.58
2018	INAS World Indoor Athletics Championships	France, Val-de-Reuil	1500 m	1st place, gold medalist(s)	5:21.23
2019	World Para Athletics Junior Championships	Switzerland, Nottwil	1500 m T20 (U18)	1st place, gold medalist(s)	5:11
2019	INAS Open Europe Indoor Athletics Championships	Turkey, Istanbul	800m II1	2nd place, silver medalist(s)	2:20.53
2019	INAS Open Europe Indoor Athletics Championships	Turkey, Istanbul	1500m II1	2nd place, silver medalist(s)	5:08.49
2019	INAS Open Europe Indoor Athletics Championships	Turkey, Istanbul	4 × 200 m relay II1	1st place, gold medalist(s)	1:51.38
2019	INAS Open Europe Indoor Athletics Championships	Turkey, Istanbul	4 × 400 m relay II1	2nd place, silver medalist(s)	4:28.38

- DQ: Disqualified
- PB: Personal Best
