= Hannah Cockroft =

British wheelchair racer

Hannah Cockroft CBE DL
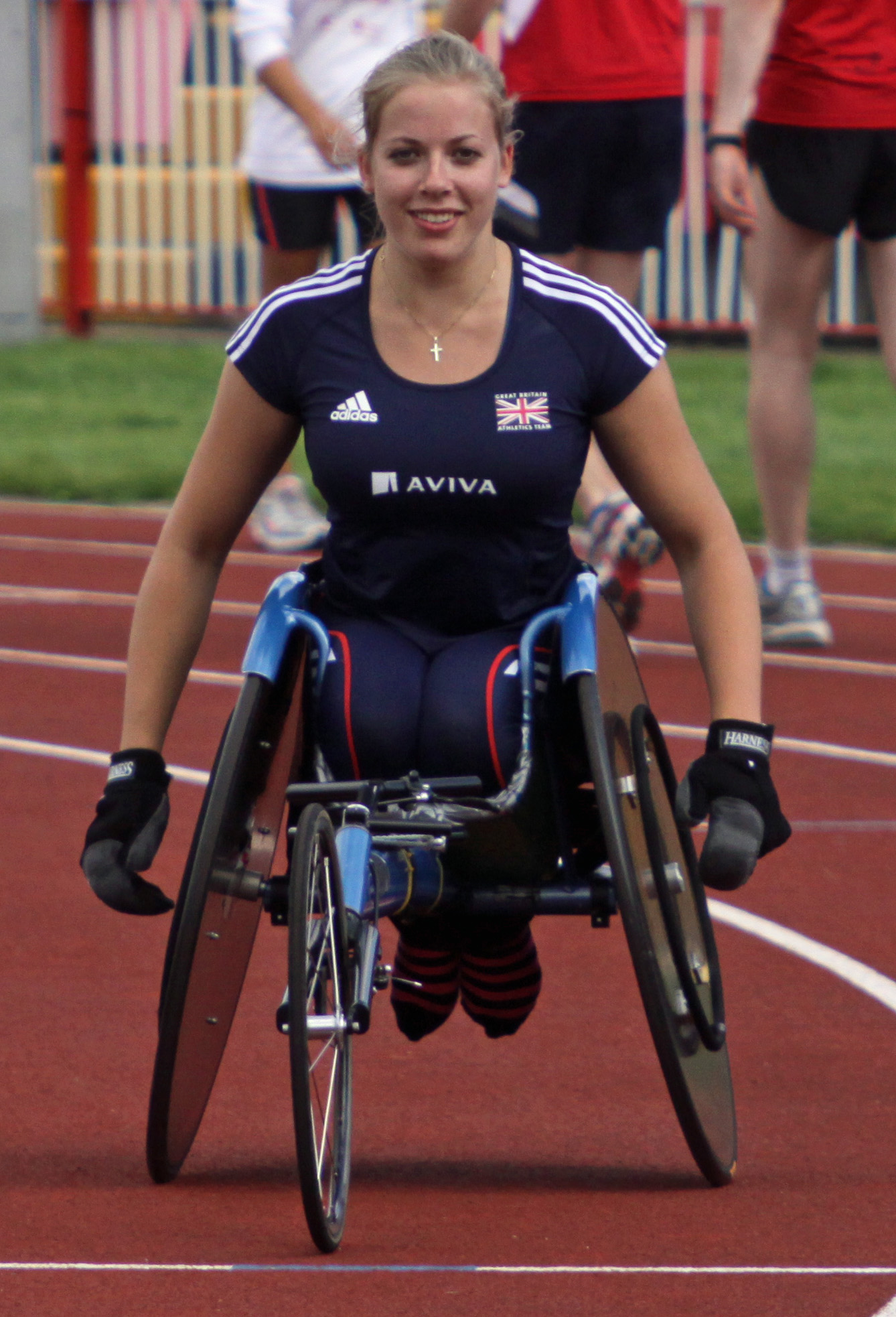
- Cockroft in 2010

Personal information
- Nickname: Hurricane Hannah
- Born: 30 July 1992 (age 34) Halifax, West Yorkshire, England
- Website: hannahcockroft.com

Sport
- Sport: Wheelchair racing
- Disability class: T34
- Events: 100 m, 200 m, 400 m, 800 m
- Club: Leeds City AC
- Coached by: Jenni Banks

Achievements and titles
- Paralympic finals: 2012, 2016, 2020, 2024
Medal record
Women's para athletics
Representing Great Britain
Paralympic Games
Gold medal – first place	2012 London	100 m T34
Gold medal – first place	2012 London	200 m T34
Gold medal – first place	2016 Rio	100 m T34
Gold medal – first place	2016 Rio	400 m T34
Gold medal – first place	2016 Rio	800 m T34
Gold medal – first place	2020 Tokyo	100 m T34
Gold medal – first place	2020 Tokyo	800 m T34
Gold medal – first place	2024 Paris	100 m T34
Gold medal – first place	2024 Paris	800 m T34
World Championships
Gold medal – first place	2011 Christchurch	100 m T34
Gold medal – first place	2011 Christchurch	200 m T34
Gold medal – first place	2013 Lyon	100 m T34
Gold medal – first place	2013 Lyon	200 m T34
Gold medal – first place	2015 Doha	100 m T34
Gold medal – first place	2015 Doha	400 m T34
Gold medal – first place	2015 Doha	800 m T34
Gold medal – first place	2017 London	100 m T34
Gold medal – first place	2017 London	400 m T34
Gold medal – first place	2017 London	800 m T34
Gold medal – first place	2019 Dubai	100 m T34
Gold medal – first place	2019 Dubai	800 m T34
Gold medal – first place	2023 Paris	100 m T34
Gold medal – first place	2023 Paris	800 m T34
Gold medal – first place	2024 Kobe	100 m T34
Gold medal – first place	2024 Kobe	800 m T34
Gold medal – first place	2025 New Delhi	100 m T34
Gold medal – first place	2025 New Delhi	400 m T34
Gold medal – first place	2025 New Delhi	800 m T34
European Championships
Gold medal – first place	2014 Swansea	100 m – T34
Gold medal – first place	2014 Swansea	800 m – T34
Silver medal – second place	2018 Berlin	100 m – T34
Gold medal – first place	2018 Berlin	800 m – T34
IWAS World Junior Championships
Gold medal – first place	2011 Dubai	200 m T34/53
Gold medal – first place	2011 Dubai	400 m T34/53
Silver medal – second place	2011 Dubai	100 m T34/53
Silver medal – second place	2011 Dubai	800 m T34/53

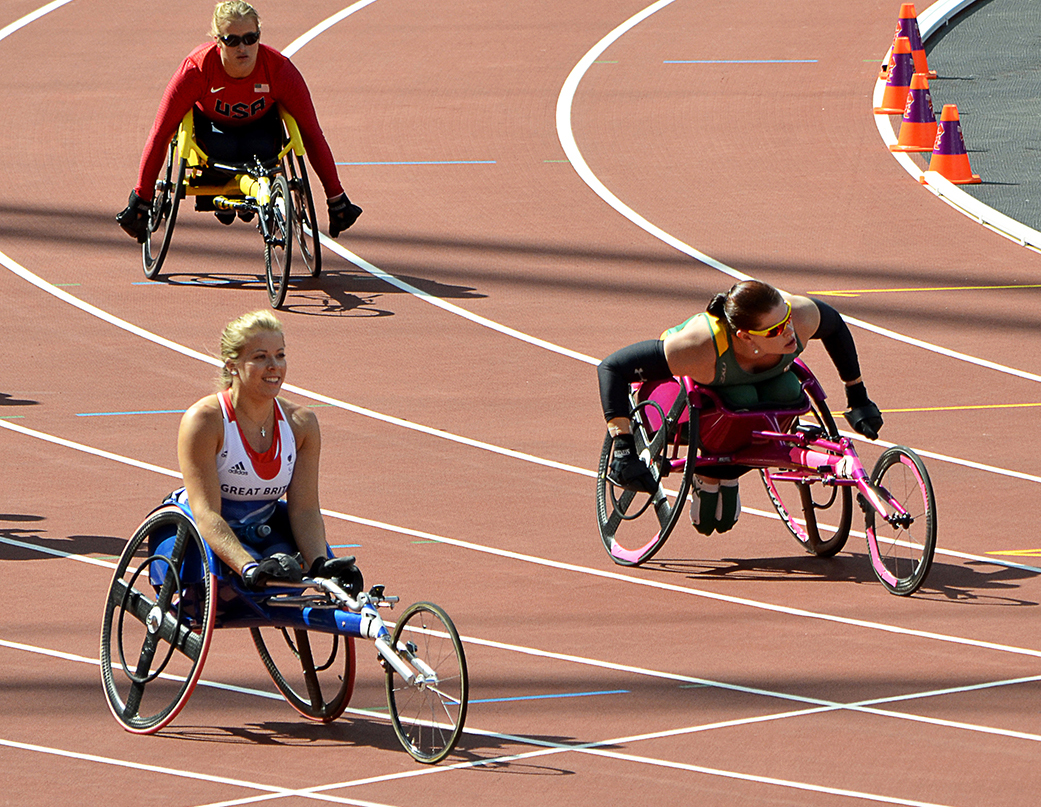
100 m 18.06 gold medal at the 2012 Paralympic Games

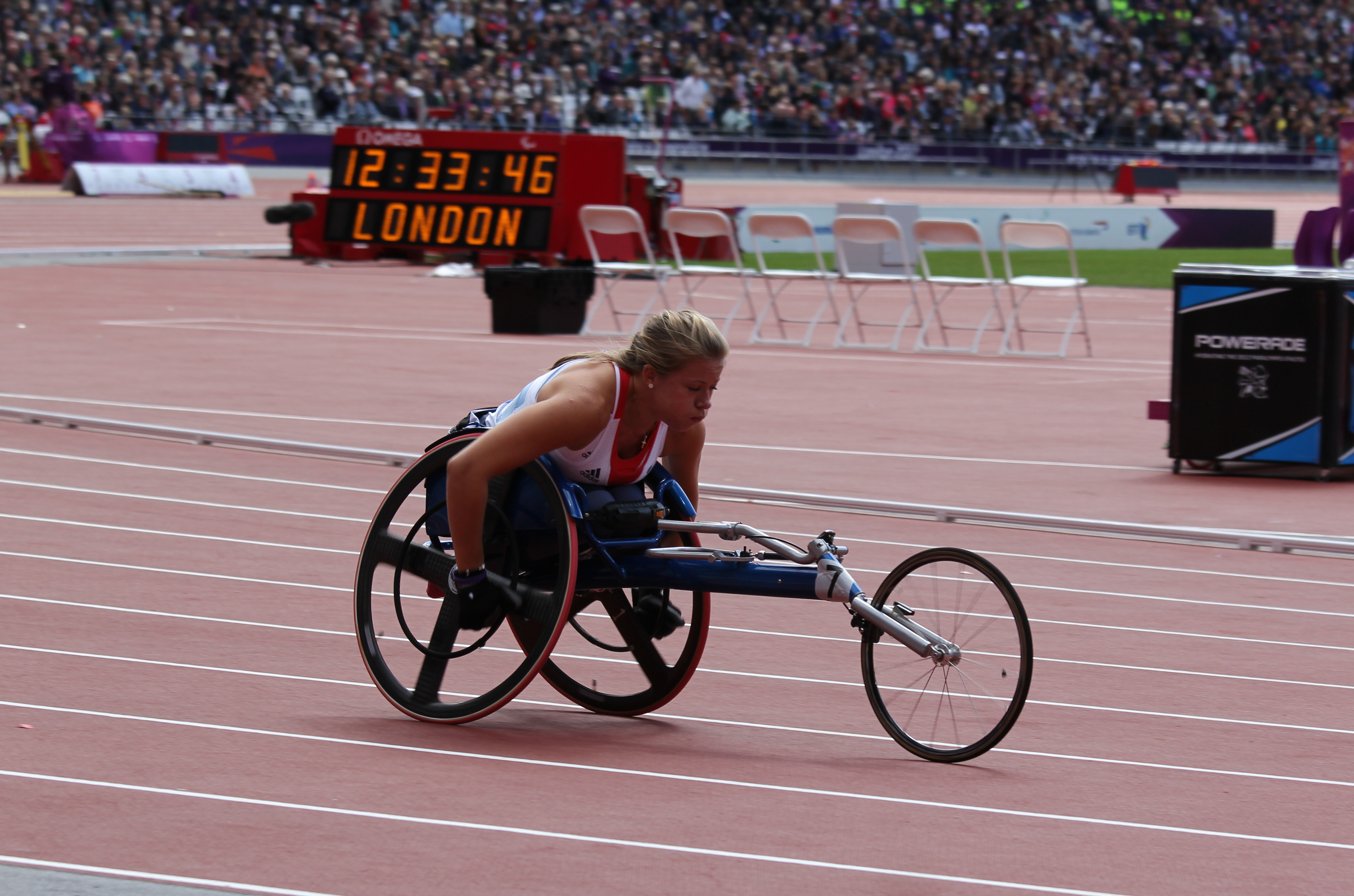
Cockroft winning the 100 m T34 qualifying heat at the 2012 Summer Paralympics

Hannah Lucy Cockroft (born 30 July 1992) is a British wheelchair racer, specialising in sprint distances in the T34 classification, and a TV presenter.

She holds the world records for the 100 metres, 200 metres, 400 metres, 800 metres and 1500 metres in her classification and the Paralympic records at 100 metres, 200 metres, 400 metres and 800 metres. Competing for Great Britain at the 2012 Summer Paralympics, she won two gold medals. She won three further gold medals at the 2016 Summer Paralympics in Rio de Janeiro.

== Early years ==
Cockroft was born on 30 July 1992 in Halifax, West Yorkshire. She had two cardiac arrests after birth which left her with permanent damage in numerous areas of her brain, resulting in weak hips, deformed feet and legs and mobility problems and affecting the fine motor skills in her hands. She is able to walk short distances but uses a wheelchair for long distances.

=== Introduction to wheelchair racing ===
After being turned away from sport throughout her primary education, Cockroft competed at secondary school in swimming, seated discus and wheelchair basketball.

As a result of a silver medal performance in the seated discus at the UK School Games, she attended a British Paralympic Association talent day at Loughborough University in October 2007. Here, she was given her first opportunity to try an elite racing wheelchair by Dr Ian Thompson, husband of former wheelchair racer Tanni Grey-Thompson.

Thompson went on to coach her for the first year of her career. In 2008 a dance academy she attended gave the proceeds from programme sales at its annual show to help her buy her own racing chair, but when it arrived, its made-to-measure set up was incorrect, so her father, a welder, modified the wheelchair to fit. After returning to the UK School Games that year, and taking gold in her first competitive 100 metres race, she was subsequently invited to join the Great Britain Paralympic Team shortly after the Beijing Paralympics. In 2009, Cockroft participated in her first ever road race, London Mini Marathon, taking the Champion title in the girls' 14–19 age group category.

== Career ==
=== 2010 ===
By 2010, Cockroft was being coached by Peter Eriksson, head Paralympic coach at UK Athletics. She again competed in the London Mini marathon, retaining her title as the female champion and at the Knowsley disability athletics challenge in May, she broke her first World Record in the T34 400 metres, recording a time of 65.51 seconds. Later that month, Cockroft sat her A-level exams and broke seven more world records in the space of eight days. At the Aviva and UK Athletics Awards in December, she received the Best British Paralympic Performance award for 2010.

=== 2011 ===
Cockroft made her senior Great Britain team debut at the age of 19, at the 2011 IPC Athletics World Championships in Christchurch, New Zealand. Here, she took gold in the T34 100 metres and the T34 200 metres. Later that year she made her junior representative debut at the IWAS World Junior Championships, winning both the 200 metres and 400 metres. Her performances earned her a second Best British Paralympic Performance award in November 2011 and honorary lifetime membership of her athletics club, Leeds City AC.

=== 2012 ===
In May 2012, Cockroft became the first Paralympic athlete to break a world record in the London Olympic Stadium, recording a time of 18.56 seconds to win the T34 100 metres. She broke the record again at the Swiss National Championships later that month, finishing in 17.60 seconds.

On 31 August 2012, Cockroft competed in her first Paralympic Games final and won Great Britain's first track gold medal since 2004, and first track and field gold medal of the 2012 Summer Paralympics, winning the final of the 100 metres T34 in 18.05 seconds, a Paralympic record. On 6 September, she won another gold medal in 200 metres T34 in 31.90 seconds, also a Paralympic record.

In honour of her achievements at London 2012, Royal Mail issued two postage stamps featuring Cockroft and painted two post boxes gold in her home town of Halifax. She was awarded the freedom of Calderdale at a homecoming event at the Halifax Piece Hall and was named an MBE in the 2013 New Year Honours.

=== 2013 ===
On 28 July, Cockroft won the T33/T34 100 metres race at the Anniversary Games at the Olympic Stadium with a stadium record time of 17.80 seconds. Later that month, at the IPC Athletics World Championships in Lyon, Cockroft retained both her T34 100 metres and T34 200 metres titles.

Cockroft was named in the 2013 BBC Sports Personality of the Year shortlist, coming 7th overall. She was the first Paralympian to ever be nominated for the award outside of a Paralympic year.

=== 2014 ===
In March, Cockroft competed in and won a Sport Relief edition of Strictly Come Dancing, dancing with Pasha Kovalev. On 1 June, Cockroft recorded a new world-record time of 3.53.57 over 1500 metres during the Bedford International Games.

In August, Cockroft took gold in 100 metres and for the first time competed in the 800 metres, winning gold at her first IPC European Championships that were held in Swansea. She later took her fourth title as British Athletics Para athlete of the year and was named Athletics Weekly female para athlete of the year.

=== 2015 ===
2015 saw Cockroft lose her first race in seven years, when she came second to British compatriot Kare Adenegan over 400 metres at the Newham open meet in July. She won the 800 metres later the same day. In Doha at the IPC World Championships at the end of the season, Cockroft retained her world champion title over the 100 metres, and won her first gold medals over the 400 metres and 800 metres, on a world championship stage.

=== 2016 ===
At the 2016 Rio Summer Paralympic Games, Cockroft won three gold medals, retaining her title in the Women's 100 metres T34 Final, and winning the Women's 400 metres T34 Final, recording a new world-record time of 58.78 seconds, and the Women's 800 metres T34 Final. She broke the Games record in all three events. Upon her return home, she was appointed Deputy Lieutenant of West Yorkshire.

=== 2017 ===
In 2017, Cockroft raced over the 1500 metres for the third time in her career, breaking the T34 World record with a time of 3.50.22. She now held the full set of T34 World Records for the first time. At the same meet, held in Arbon in Switzerland, she also demolished her 400-metre World record set the previous year at the Rio 2016 Paralympic Games, and her 800-metre World Record, recording a new time of 1.55.73. In July, she returned 'home' to the QEII Olympic Stadium in Stratford to compete in her fourth World Championships. Although she had food poisoning the night before the T34 100 metres final, Cockroft powered home to take gold in a new world-record time of 17.18 seconds. She also became world champion over the 800 metres and 400 metres, making her a 10-time world champion and the most decorated British athlete in World Championship history. Cockroft was named British Sportswoman of the year by the Sports Journalists Association for her achievements. She was the first Paralympic athlete to ever win the award in its 57-year history.

=== 2018 ===
2018 saw Cockroft's first defeat on the international stage. After topping the podium for seven years, the 26-year-old won silver in the T34 100 metres at the World Para Athletics European Championships in Berlin. She then went on to regain her European Champion title over the 800 metres, after missing the event in 2016.

=== 2021 ===
In June 2021, Cockroft was among the first dozen athletes chosen to represent the UK at the postponed 2020 Paralympics in Tokyo. At the end of June, she was in Manchester for the British Athletic Championships where she was first in a mixed classification 400 metres wheelchair race in front of Sammi Kinghorn and Mel Woods. She successfully retained her women's 100 metres T34 Paralympic title after winning gold at the Tokyo Paralympics with a new world record timing of 16.39 seconds. It was also her third consecutive Paralympic gold medal in women's 100 metres event and her seventh Paralympic gold medal.

=== 2023 ===
In July 2023, she won her sixth 100m world title at the Para Athletics World Championships in Paris.

=== 2024 ===
Cockroft was selected to compete at the 2024 Summer Paralympics held in Paris, France. In the 100m T34 she won gold with a time of 17.99, more than a second ahead of teammate Kare Adenegan In the 800m T34, she also won gold in a time of 1:55:44, eight seconds ahead of teammate and silver medallist Kare Adenegan, bringing her Olympic gold medals tally to nine.

=== 2025 ===
At the 2025 World Para Athletics Championships in New Delhi, Cockroft won gold in the T34 400m category with a time of 55:62. The victory earned Cockroft the 29th major title of her career.

== Personal life ==
Cockroft left her home and training base in Yorkshire to study journalism and media at Coventry University in 2013. She moved back to her home town of Halifax in 2016 to prepare for the Rio Paralympic Games. She has ambitions to work in television media after her athletics career.

In October 2014, Cockroft challenged then-Mayor of London Boris Johnson to spend a day in a wheelchair, with Cockroft claiming that "wheelchair access on the [London Underground] is so bad" the Mayor would not be able to attend all his appointments. Mayor Johnson declined the challenge, but thanked Cockroft for her efforts to highlight accessibility challenges.

In October 2014 she launched 17 Sports Management Limited ("17"), a sports management company.

She cites Canadian wheelchair racer Chantal Petitclerc as her sporting inspiration. Petitclerc, winner of 15 Paralympic gold medals and formerly coached by Eriksson, has been involved with Cockroft's development as a mentor and advisor.

In March 2019 she appeared on a special Stand Up To Cancer episode of The Great British Bake Off on Channel 4. In 2020, Cockcroft and her partner Nathan Maguire appeared together on a celebrity special of the BBC television programme The Hit List.

== Honours ==
Cockroft was appointed Member of the Order of the British Empire (MBE) in the 2013 New Year Honours, Officer of the Order of the British Empire (OBE) in the 2022 New Year Honours, and Commander of the Order of the British Empire (CBE) in the 2025 New Year Honours, all for services to athletics.

She was awarded the Freedom of the Borough of Calderdale on 13 September 2012 and was appointed Deputy Lieutenant of West Yorkshire in October 2016. She has been awarded honorary degrees by the University of Bradford (in 2014) and York St John University (in 2016).

== Statistics ==
Personal Bests
Event	Time	Competition	Location	Date
100m	17.18	World Para Athletics Championships	London, UK	14 July 2017
200m	30.51	Daniella Jutzeler Memorial Meet	Arbon, Switzerland	4 June 2015
400m	57.73	Swiss National Championships	Arbon, Switzerland	27 May 2017
800m	1.55.73	Swiss National Championships	Arbon, Switzerland	28 May 2017
1500m	3.50.22	Para Athletics Grand Prix	Nottwil, Switzerland	3 June 2017

=== Records ===
Event	Time	Competition	Location	Date
World records
200 metres T34	30.51	Daniella Jutzeler Memorial Meet	Arbon, Switzerland	4 June 2015
400 metres T34	57.73	Swiss National Championships	Arbon, Switzerland	27 May 2017
800 metres T34	1.55.73	Swiss National Championships	Arbon, Switzerland	28 May 2017
Paralympic records
100 metres T34	17.42	2016 Summer Paralympics	Rio de Janeiro, Brazil	10 September 2016
200 metres T34	31.90	2012 Summer Paralympics	London, United Kingdom	6 September 2012
400 metres T34	58.78	2016 Summer Paralympics	Rio de Janeiro, Brazil	14 September 2016
800 metres T34	2.00.62	2016 Summer Paralympics	Rio de Janeiro, Brazil	16 September 2016

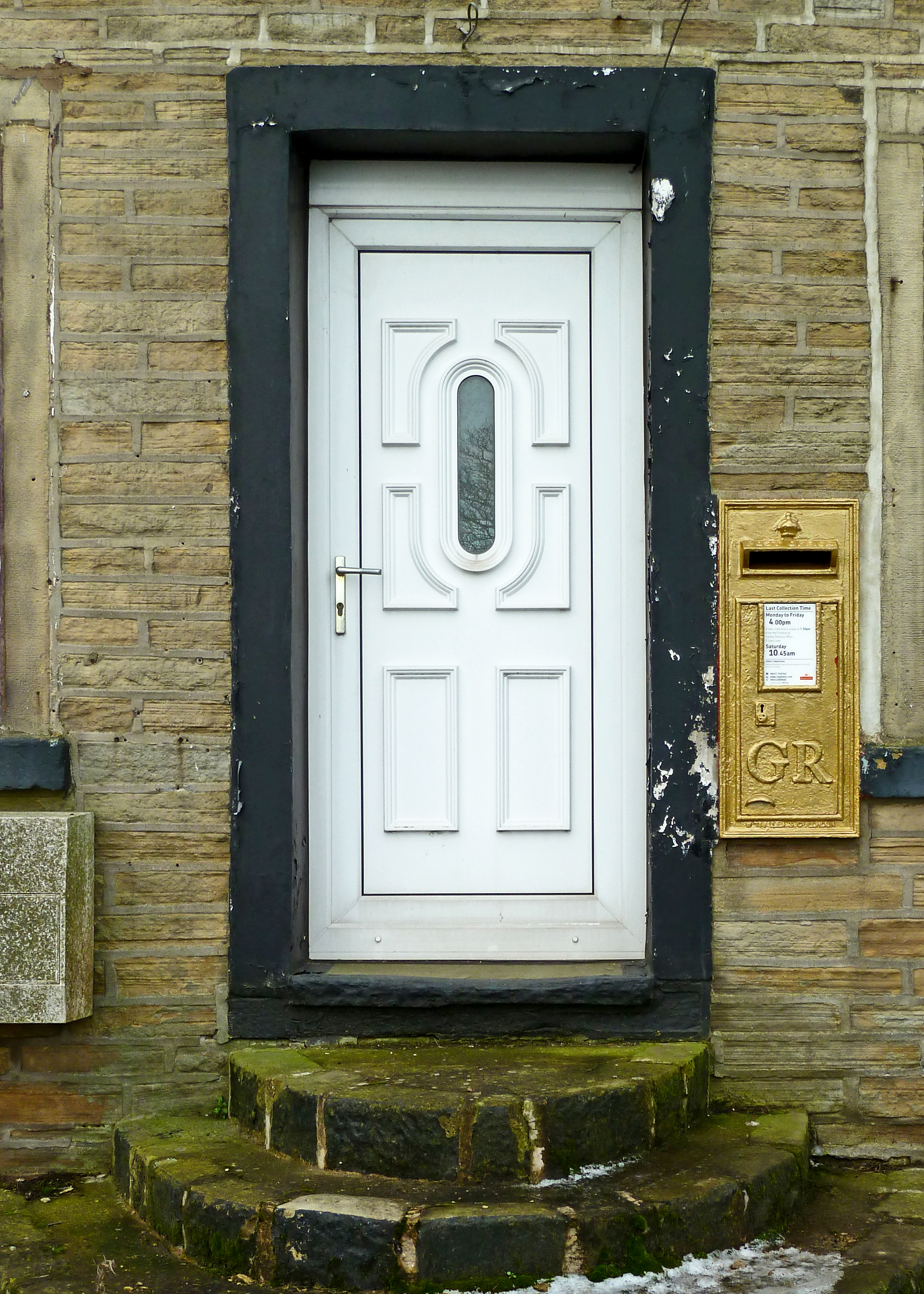
Hannah Cockroft's gold postbox in Mount Tabor, West Yorkshire

== See also ==
- 2012 Olympics gold post boxes in the United Kingdom
