= Diana Coraza =

Mexican Paralympic athlete

Personal information
- Full name: Diana Laura Coraza Castañeda
- Born: 6 June 1995 (age 31) Tlaxcala, Mexico

Sport
- Country: Mexico
- Sport: Para athletics
- Disability: Glaucoma
- Disability class: T11
- Event(s): 400 metres 800 metres 1500 metres
Medal record
Para athletics
Representing Mexico
World Championships
| Gold medal – first place | 2017 London | 800m T11 |
| Silver medal – second place | 2017 London | 400m T11 |
Parapan American Games
| Gold medal – first place | 2023 Santiago | 1500m T11 |
| Bronze medal – third place | 2019 Lima | 400m T11 |

Diana Laura Coraza Castañeda (born 6 June 1995) is a Mexican blind para athlete who competes in sprinting and middle-distance running events at international elite competitions. She is a World Para Athletics Championships and a Parapan American Games champion.
