= Joyce Lefevre =

Belgian Paralympic athlete

Personal information
- Born: 28 June 1988 (age 38) Jette, Belgium
- Home town: Deurne, Belgium
- Height: 1.61 m (5 ft 3 in)
- Weight: 53 kg (117 lb)

Sport
- Country: Belgium
- Sport: Paralympic athletics
- Disability: Cerebral palsy
- Disability class: T34
- Club: Wapper VZW, Wommelgem
- Coached by: Mieke Van Thuyne
Medal record
Paralympic athletics
Representing Belgium
European Championships
Bronze medal – third place	2016 Grosseto	Women's 100m T34
Bronze medal – third place	2016 Grosseto	Women's 400m T34
Bronze medal – third place	2018 Berlin	Women's 100m T34
Bronze medal – third place	2018 Berlin	Women's 800m T34

Joyce Lefevre (born 28 June 1988) is a Belgian Paralympic athlete who competes in international level events. She competed at the 2020 Summer Paralympics, in 100m T34, and 800m T34.

She competed at the 2018 European Championships, in the T34 100m, winning a bronze medal.
