= Sammi Kinghorn =

Scottish wheelchair racer

Sammi Kinghorn OBE
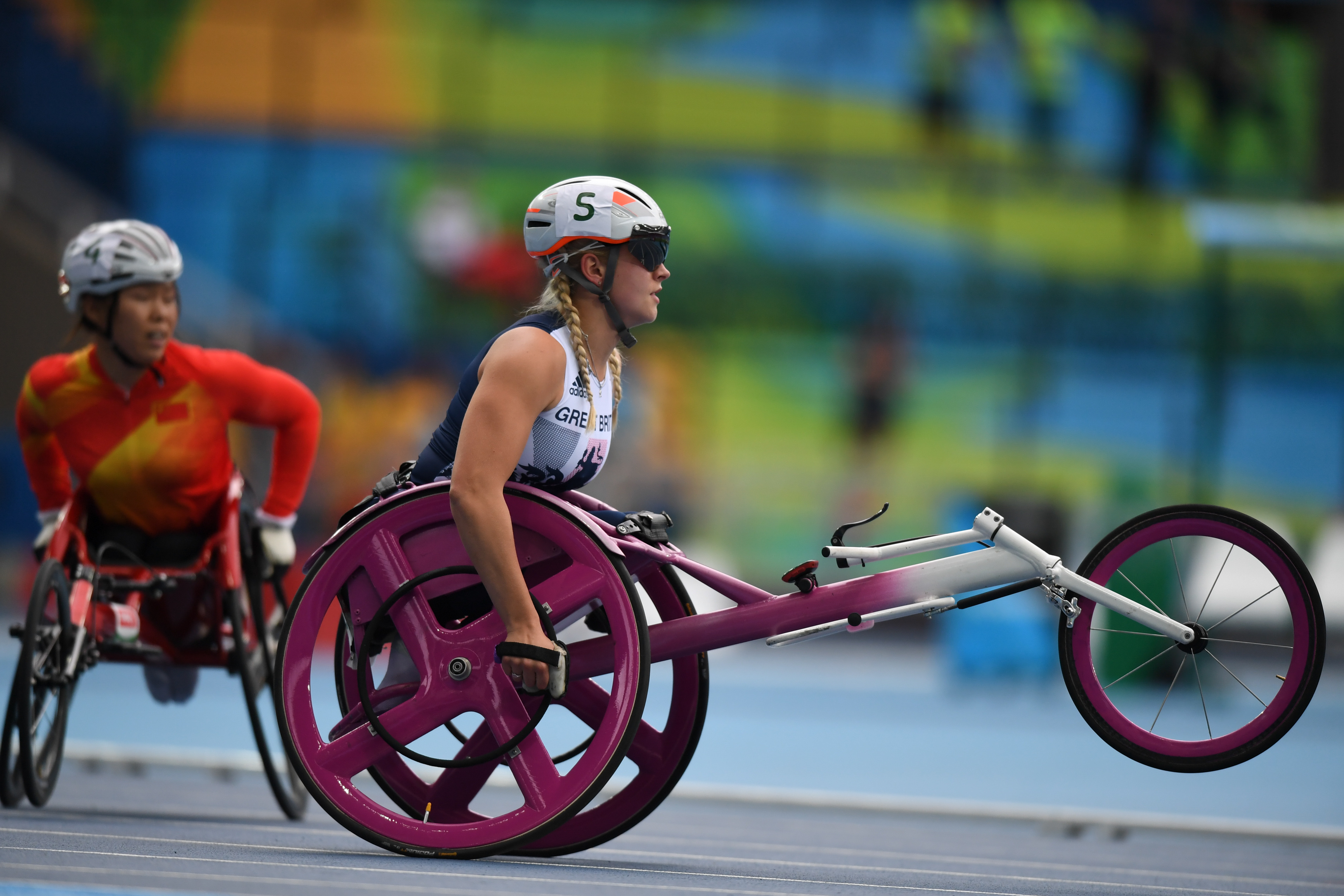
- Kinghorn in 2024

Personal information
- Full name: Samantha May Kinghorn
- Born: 6 January 1996 (age 30)
- Education: Earlston High School

Sport
- Sport: Wheelchair racing
- Disability: Paralysed below the waist
- Disability class: T53
- Club: Red Star
- Coached by: Ian Mirfin
Medal record
Women's para-athletics
Representing Great Britain
Paralympic Games
Gold medal – first place	2024 Paris	100 m T53
Silver medal – second place	2024 Paris	400 m T53
Silver medal – second place	2024 Paris	800 m T53
Silver medal – second place	2024 Paris	1500 m T54
Silver medal – second place	2024 Paris	mixed 4×100 m relay
Bronze medal – third place	2020 Tokyo	100 m T53
World Championships
Gold medal – first place	2017 London	100m - T53
Gold medal – first place	2017 London	200m - T53
Gold medal – first place	2023 Paris	100m - T53
Silver medal – second place	2023 Paris	400m - T53
Silver medal – second place	2023 Paris	800m - T53
Bronze medal – third place	2015 Doha	200m - T53
European Championships
Gold medal – first place	2014 Swansea	100m - T53
Gold medal – first place	2014 Swansea	400m - T53
Gold medal – first place	2014 Swansea	800m - T53

Samantha May Kinghorn (born 6 January 1996) is a British World Champion wheelchair racer and TV presenter. At the 2024 paralympics she won a gold medal.

== Personal history ==
Kinghorn broke her back in December 2010 at the age of 14. An original BBC news item reported that she had been crushed by snow and ice which fell from the roof of her home, but she later stated that she had jumped onto the forklift that her father Neill, a farm worker, was driving and was crushed underneath it; she admitted that it had been entirely her fault and her father had not been able to spot her due to the weather conditions. She had emergency surgery and spent five months in hospital in Glasgow, but the injury to her spine left her paralysed from the waist down. Since then she has used a wheelchair for mobility. While in the Spinal Injuries Unit at Southern General Hospital her physiotherapist took her to Stoke Mandeville Stadium to take part in the WheelPower Inter Spinal Games where she was able to try out a variety of wheelchair sports, leading to her taking up wheelchair racing. She said:

I thought I’d be in a bed forever. So, to then get into a wheelchair was amazing. I know it sounds strange, but I was so happy. “Then to find I could actually compete in sport in my wheelchair has just been incredible. Sport has helped me hugely, helped me to really accept it .

== Athletics career ==
Kinghorn is part of the Glasgow disability sports club Red Star, where she is coached by Ian Mirfin MBE (new years honours list 2015/16). She is classified as a T53 para-athlete. Sammi is the fastest ever female British wheelchair racer regardless of classification over 100m, 200m, 400m and 800m.

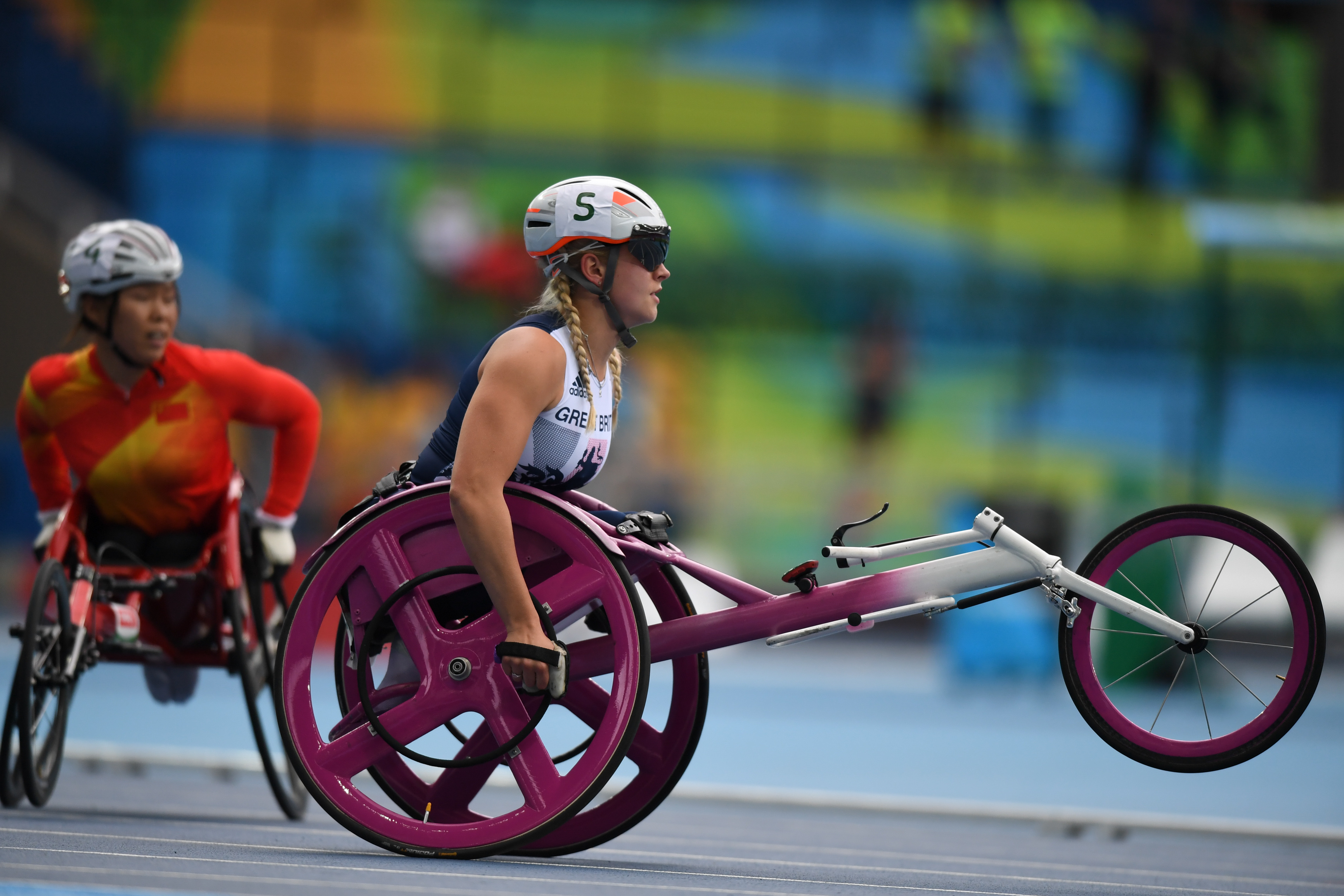
Samantha Kinghorn at the 2016 Summer Paralympic Games, T53 100 metres sprint, where she finished fifth.

Kinghorn's first race was the 2012 London Mini Marathon, where she came second. Since then she has won many medals in domestic competitions and set Scottish records in the 100m and 200m. In 2013 Kinghorn was one of the first competitors to be named in the Scotland squad for the 2014 Commonwealth Games in Glasgow. She was chosen to be an athlete ambassador for Harper Macleod and a short promotional film was made of her preparations for the Games. In the buildup to the Games, Kinghorn was named Glasgow's Disabled Athlete of the Year. At the Commonwealth Games she took part in the T54 1500m, and after qualifying third in her heat, she placed fifth in the final.

Kinghorn represented Team GB at the 2014 IPC European Championships in Swansea where she won Britain's first gold medal in the T53 Women's 400m and went on to win further golds over 100m and 800m.

Kinghorn competed for Team GB at 2016 Paralympic Games in Rio de Janeiro. She placed 5th and 6th in the 100m and 400m T53 events but was disqualified in the 400m

Kinghorn achieved a sprint double at the 2017 World Para Athletics Championships in the winning the 100m and 200m.

In 2017 she debuted over the marathon distance in an attempt to qualify for the 2018 Commonwealth Games

At the end of June 2021 she was in Manchester for the British Athletic Championships where she was second in a mixed classification 400m wheelchair race behind Hannah Cockroft and with Mel Woods third.

Kinghorn was among nine Scottish athletes who were chosen to compete at the postponed 2020 Summer Paralympics. Most were announced in July 2021. The others were Mel Woods, Libby Clegg, Jo Butterfield, Maria Lyle, Owen Miller, Derek Rae, Stef Reid and Ben Rowlings.

Kinghorn was appointed Member of the Order of the British Empire (MBE) in the 2022 Birthday Honours for services to disability sport.

Kinghorn represented Team GB at the 2024 Paralympic Games in Paris, where she won a gold medal in the T53 Women's 100m, and silver in the 400m, 800m, and 1,500m.

Kinghorn was appointed Officer of the Order of the British Empire (OBE) in the 2025 New Year Honours for services to athletics.

== Career in television ==
In 2023, Kinghorn began her career in television by appearing as a presenter on BBC's Countryfile. She had previously featured in an episode of BBC's The One Show.
