= Wheelchair racing =

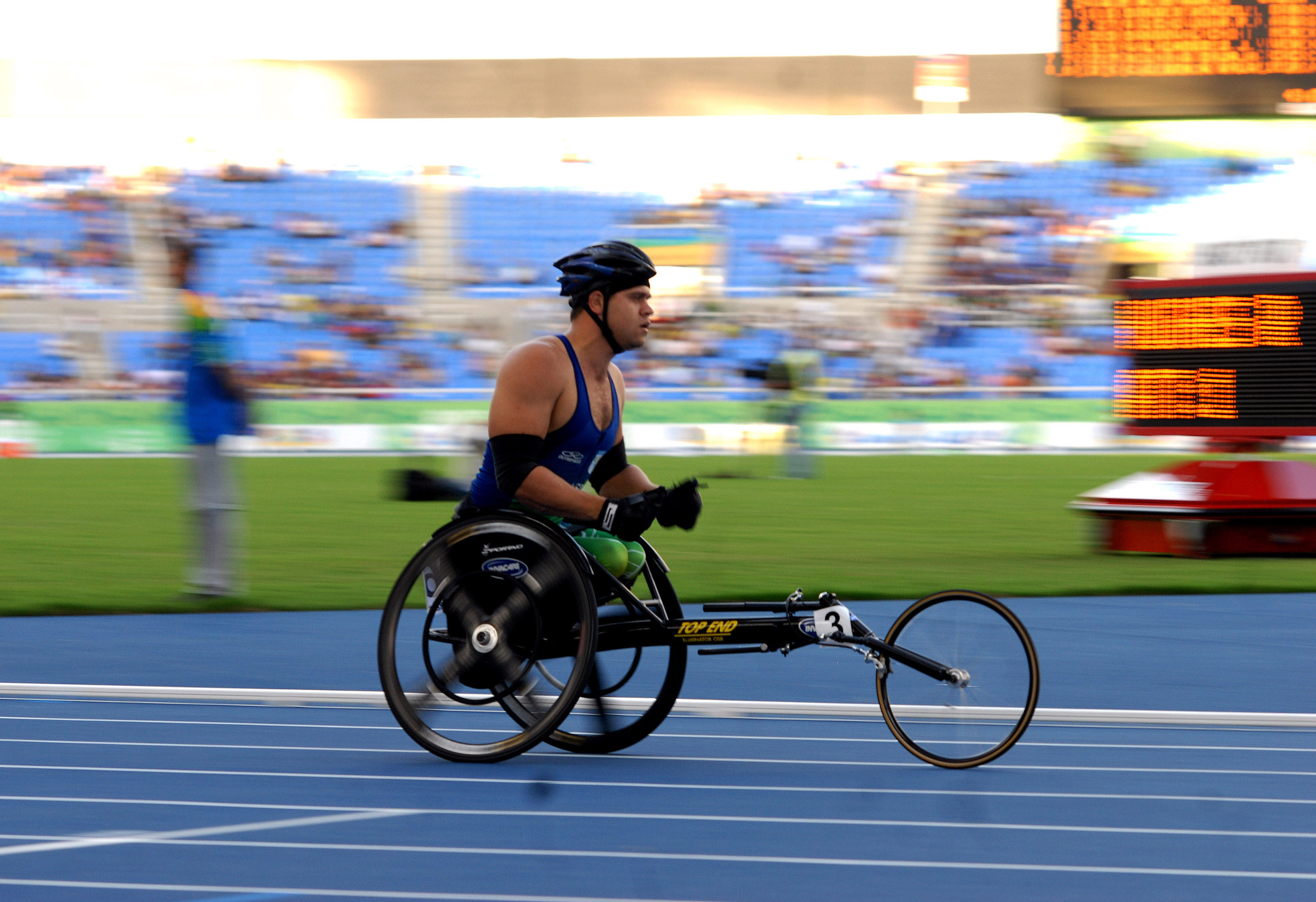
Brazilian athlete Wendel Silva Soares in the 400 m wheelchair race at the 2007 Parapan American Games

Wheelchair racing is the racing of wheelchairs in track and road races. Wheelchair racing is open to athletes with any qualifying type of disability, including leg amputees, spinal cord injuries, and cerebral palsy. Athletes are classified in accordance with the nature and severity of their disability or combinations of disabilities. Like running, it can take place on a track or as a road race. The main competitions take place at the Summer Paralympics which wheelchair racing and athletics has been a part of since 1960. Competitors compete in specialized wheelchairs which allow the athletes to reach speeds of 30 km/h (18.6 mph) or more. It is one of the most prominent forms of Paralympic athletics.

== History ==
The World Wars significantly influenced society's view and treatment of individuals with disabilities. Before the wars, individuals with disabilities were considered as burdens on society. As many veterans of war returned home with physical impairments and psychological needs, new programs had to be put in place to help make the transition back into society, as traditional methods were not able to accommodate.

The British government is credited with being the first to recognize these needs by opening the Spinal Injuries Centre at Stoke Mandeville Hospital in Aylesbury, England, in 1944. Sir Ludwig Guttmann, director of this center, introduced competitive sports as an integral part of the rehabilitation of disabled veterans.

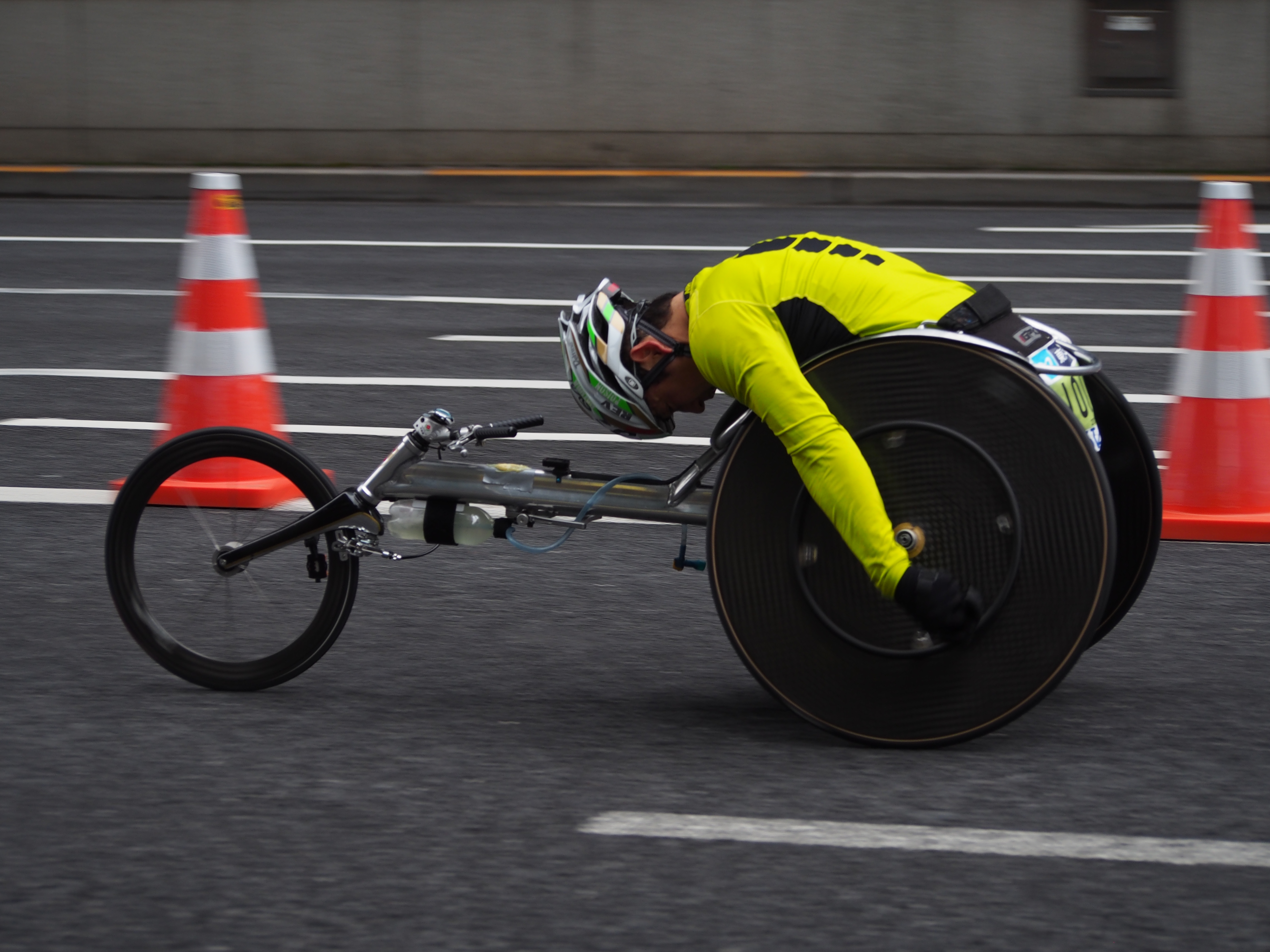
A men's wheelchair racer at the 2015 Tokyo Marathon

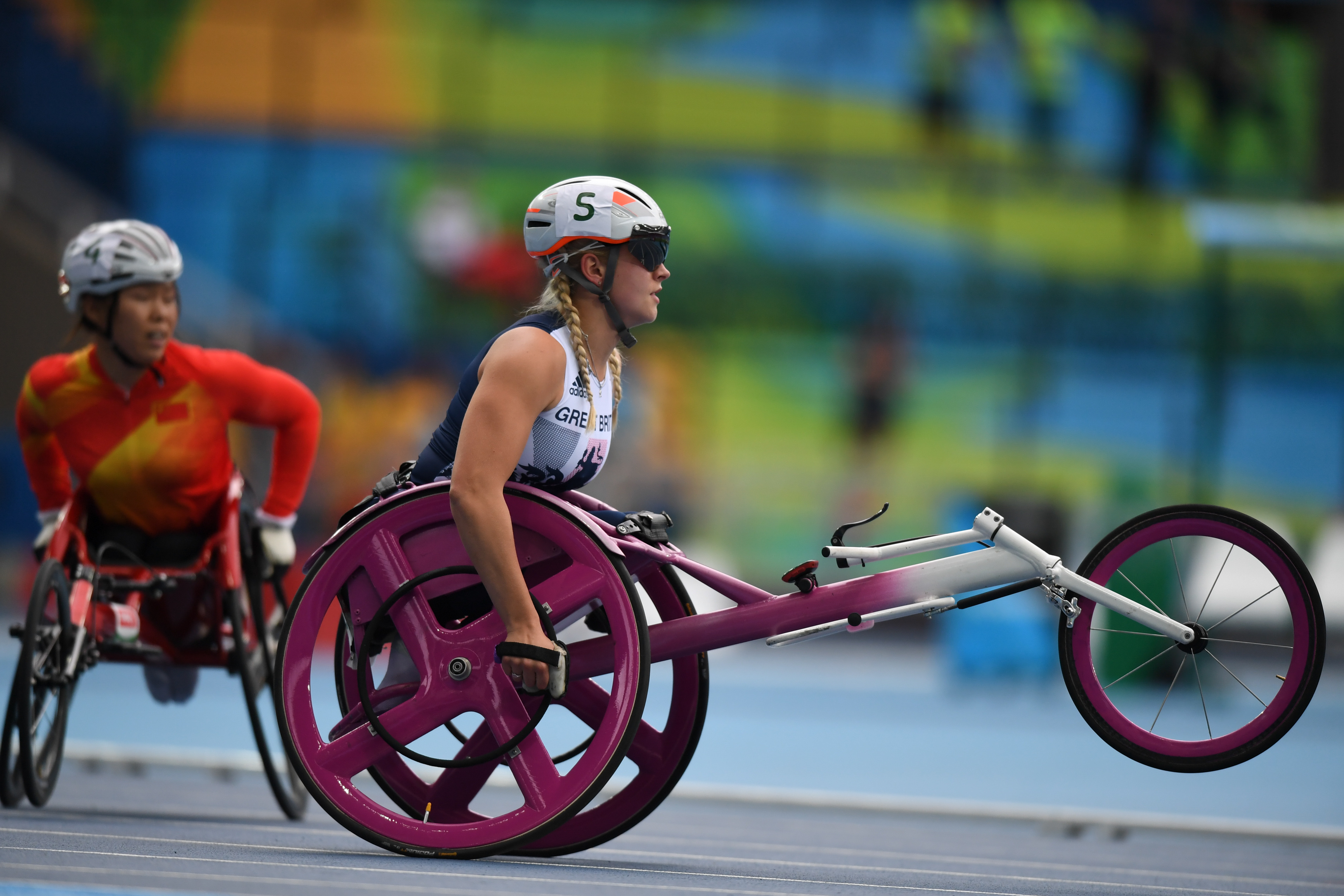
Samantha Kinghorn at the 2016 Summer Paralympic Games, T53 100 metres sprint.

With Guttmann's guidance, the first Stoke Mandeville Games were held in 1948. In the late 1940s, sports for rehabilitation spread throughout Europe and throughout the United States. During this time competitions and sporting events for individuals in wheelchairs emerged throughout Europe.

In 1952 the first international competition for athletes in wheelchairs was organized between the British and the Netherlands. A total of 130 athletes with spinal cord injuries competed in six sports. To honor the social and human value derived from the wheelchair sport movement, the International Olympic Committee (IOC) recognized Guttmann's work in 1956 and awarded the Stoke Mandeville Games the Sir Thomas Fearnley Cup for meritorious achievement in service to the Olympic movement.

Since the beginning of the games in Stoke Mandeville wheelchair sports has expanded with the addition of many sports. Beginning with wheelchair archery, lawn bowls, table tennis, shot put, javelin, and club throw were added to the growing list. In the 1960s wheelchair basketball, fencing, snooker and weightlifting were also introduced.

In 1960 the International Stoke Mandeville Wheelchair Sports Federation (ISMWSF) was formed to allow all international competitions for individuals with spinal cord injuries. Although originally sanctioned for those with spinal cord injuries, these games were expanded in 1976 at the Olympiad for the Physically Disabled in Toronto, Canada, to include other physical and visual impairments and would evolve and eventually be referred to as the Paralympics.

In the 1960s international sports competitions were expanded to include other disability groups who were not eligible for the World Games. In addition, the International Sports Organisation for the Disabled (ISOD) was officially formed in Paris in 1964, to provide international sports opportunities for the blind, amputees and persons with other locomotor disabilities.

== Events ==
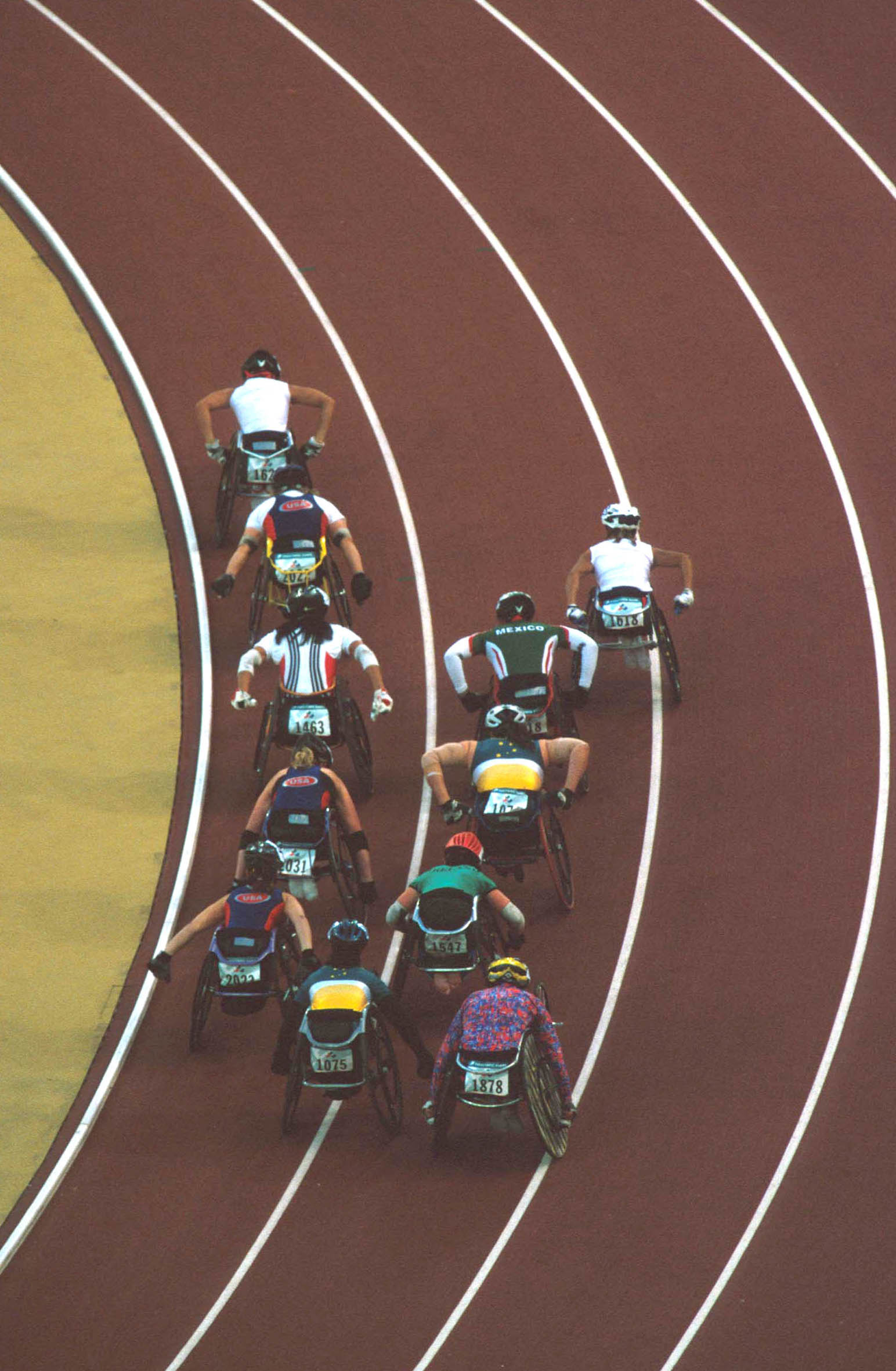
View from above of wheelchair racing competition at the 2000 Summer Paralympics

The distances involved in wheelchair racing include sprint distances of 100 m (109.4 yards), 200 m (218.7 yards) and 400 m (437.4 yards), middle distances of 800 m (874.9 yards) and 1500 m (1640.4 yards), long distances of 5000 m (3.1 miles) and 10,000 m (6.2 miles) and relay races of 4 × 100 m (109.4 yards) and 4 × 400 m (437.4 yards). There is also a road event which is the wheelchair marathon.

Athletes who are in a wheelchair can also participate in field events as well; these include shot put, javelin, and discus. There are also combined events such as the pentathlon, where the athlete participates in track and road events, and jumping and throwing events, depending on the athletes' disability and classification.

== Classifications ==
Classification systems have been put into place to ensure that the competition is fair, ensuring that all of the competitors have an equal opportunity to place, and they can because of their talent and not because their disability was less severe than the other competitors. Athletes are divided into categories depending on their disability, these are spinal cord injury or an amputee, or cerebral palsy. The classification guidelines are continually being changed to include more athletes.

Athletes who are in a wheelchair due to spinal cord injury or are an amputee are in classes T51 – T58. Classes T51 – T54 are for athletes in a wheelchair who are competing in track events, and classes T55 – T58 are for athletes who are competing in field events. An athlete who is classed as T54 is completely functional from the waist up. An athlete who is classed as T53 has restricted movement in their abdominals. An athlete who is classed as either T52 or T51 has restricted movement in their upper limbs.

Athletes who are in a wheelchair due to cerebral palsy have different guidelines compared to an athlete with a spinal cord injury or who is an amputee, and range between T32 – T38. Classes T32 –T34 are classes for athletes in a wheelchair and classes T35 – T38 are for athletes who can stand.

== Rules and regulations for wheelchairs ==
Wheelchairs are a necessary piece of equipment for athletes competing in wheelchair racing and track and field events. Many of the wheelchairs tend to be very lightweight, with pneumatic tires, and with the dimensions and features on the wheelchairs clearly specified in the IPC Athletics rules. There are rules for each event regarding the athletes' equipment. The rules are:

Rule 159 Para 1 The wheelchair shall have at least two large wheels and one small wheel.

Rule 159 Para 2 No part of the body of the chair may extend forward beyond the hub of the front wheel and be wider than the inside of the hubs of the two rear wheels. The maximum height from the ground of the main body of the chair shall be 50 cm (1.6 ft).

Rule 159 Para 3 The maximum diameter of the large wheel including the inflated tyre shall not exceed 70 cm (2.3 ft). The maximum diameter of the small wheel including the inflated tyre shall not exceed 50 cm (1.6 ft).

Rule 159 Para 4 Only one plain, round, hand rim is allowed for each large wheel. This rule may be waived for persons requiring a single arm drive chair, if so stated on their medical and Games identity cards.

Rule 159 Para 5 No mechanical gears or levers shall be allowed, that may be used to propel the chair.

Rule 159 Para 6 Only hand-operated, mechanical steering devices will be allowed.

Rule 159 Para 7 In all races of 800 metres or over, the athlete should be able to turn the front wheel(s) manually both to the left and the right.

Rule 159 Para 8 The use of mirrors is not permitted in track or road races.

Rule 159 Para 9 No part of the chair may protrude behind the vertical plane of the back edge of the rear tyres.

Rule 159 Para 10 It will be the responsibility of the competitor to ensure the wheelchair conforms to all the above rules, and no event shall be delayed whilst a competitor makes adjustments to the athletes chair.

Rule 159 Para 11 Chairs will be measured in the Marshalling Area, and may not leave that area before the start of the event. Chairs that have been examined may be liable for re-examination before or after the event by the official in charge of the event.

Rule 159 Para 12 It shall be the responsibility, in the first instance, of the official conducting the event, to rule on the safety of the chair.

Rule 159 Para 13 Athletes must ensure that no part of their lower limbs can fall to the ground or track during the event.

== See also ==
- Handcycle
