= Rosemary Little =

Australian Paralympic athlete (born 1982)

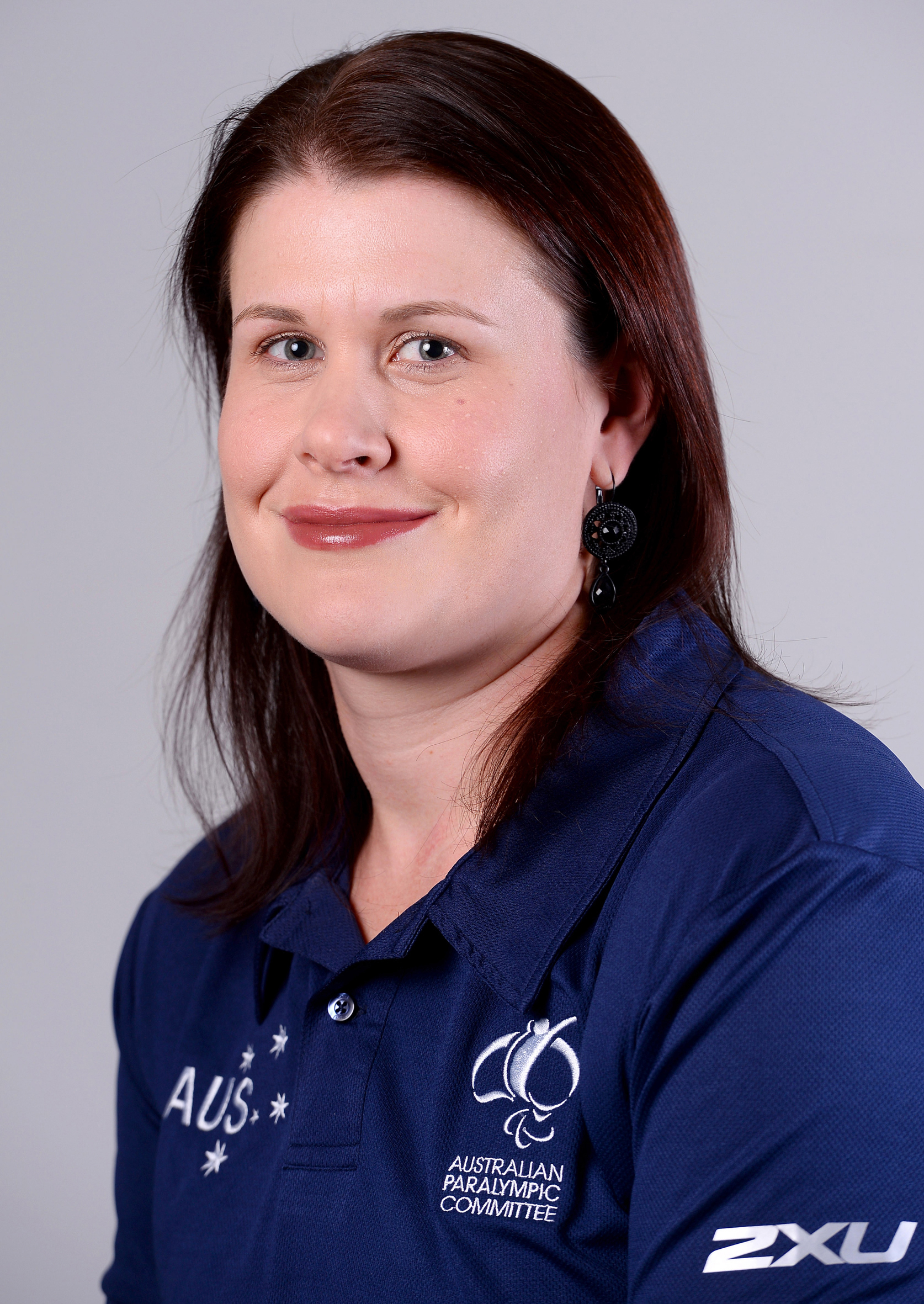
- 2016 Australian Paralympic team portrait of Little

Personal information
- Nationality: Australian
- Born: 27 August 1982 (age 44) Mackay, Queensland

Sport
- Country: Australia
- Sport: Paralympic athletics
- Coached by: Breanne Clement
Medal record
Athletics
Paralympic Games
Bronze medal – third place	2012 London	Women's 100m T34
IPC Athletics World Championships
Silver medal – second place	2013 Lyon	Women's 200m T34
Bronze medal – third place	2013 Lyon	Women's 100m T34
Bronze medal – third place	2023 Paris	Women's Shot Put F32

Rosemary Little (born 27 August 1982) is an Australian Paralympic athlete. She won a bronze medal in wheelchair racing at the 2012 Summer Paralympics, and has also competed in handcycling. She competed at the 2020 Tokyo Paralympics, her third Games, where switched from wheelchair racing to shot put. She competed in the shot put and club throw at the 2024 Paris Paralympics.

== Personal ==
Little was born on 27 August 1982 in Mackay, Queensland, and is from West Pennant Hills, New South Wales. She has a brain injury as a result of a brain virus. She has studied occupational therapy at the University of Sydney and speech and audiology at the Macquarie University.

Little has represented Australia in handcycling.

== Athletics ==
Little is a T34 wheelchair racing competitor. She started competing in athletics in 2003. Originally classified T33, she tried to qualify for the 2004 Summer Paralympics but missed the qualifying time by 0.02 seconds. One of her pre-race rituals is to eat a banana and drink a Red Bull. In 2011, she trained six days a week at Parramatta Park.

Little competed in the 2011 City2Surf, where she collided with another competitor and damaged her racing wheelchair. This put her 2012 Paralympic campaign at risk as she had to acquire the funds, around A$8,000, to get her wheelchair replaced before she could compete again. Following a newspaper appeal, she found the funds to replace her chair. She first represented Australia in 2012. In 2012, she competed in Australia's Summer Down Under wheelchair circuit. She competed in the 2012 Australian Athletics Championships, setting an unofficial record in the 100 metre event with a time of 20.60 seconds. In July 2012, she competed at the United States Paralympic track and field trials, finishing second in the 100 metre event and third in the 200 metre event. She was selected to represent Australia at the 2012 Summer Paralympics in athletics.

At the 2012 Summer Paralympics, she competed in the Women's 100 m T34 and 200 m T34, both combined T33/T34 events. She pushed a T33 World Record time in her 100 m heat; she was then reclassified to T34 and her record annulled. She won a bronze medal in the 100 m final.

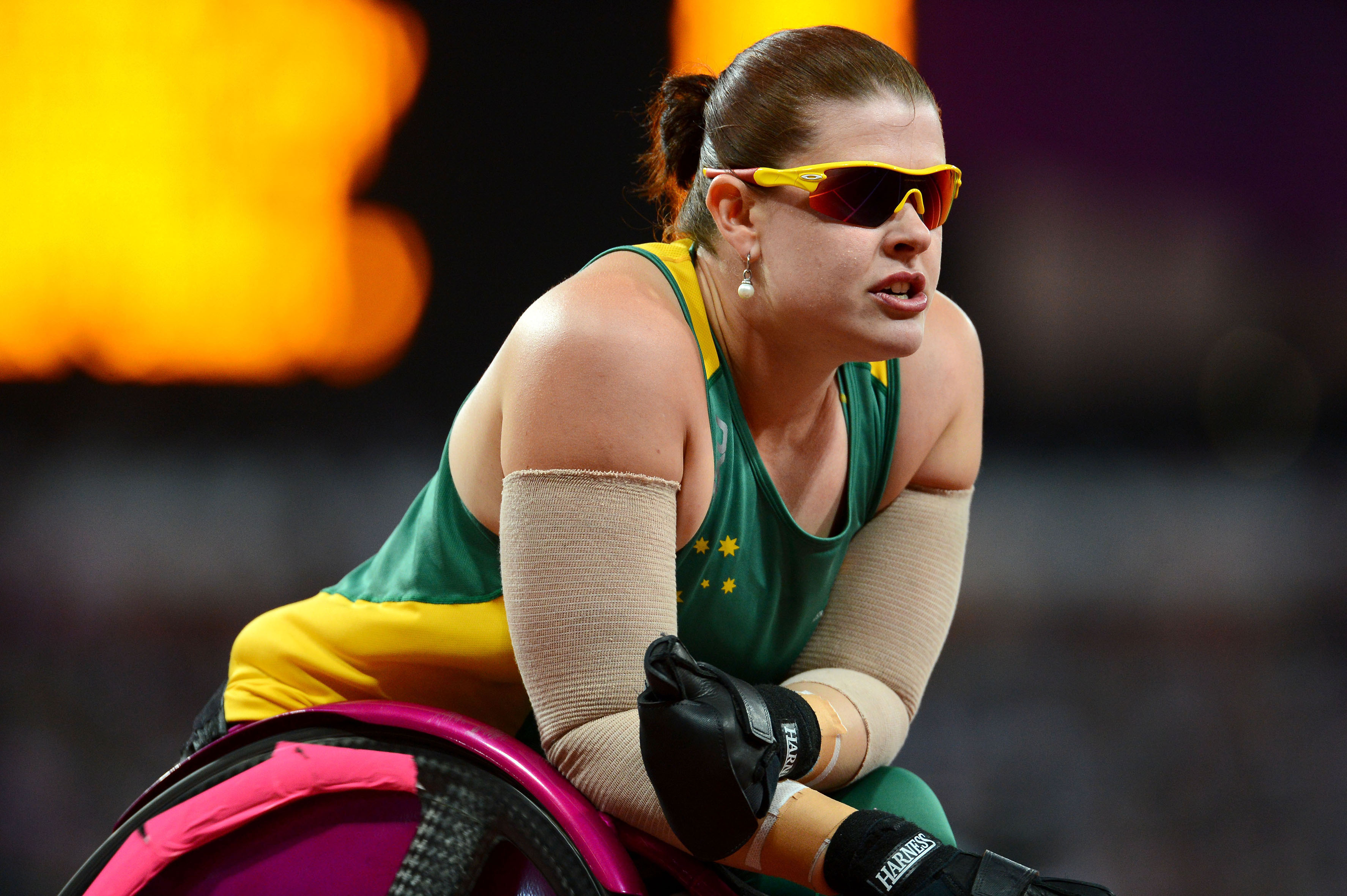
At the 2012 Paralympics in London

At the 2013 IPC Athletics World Championships in Lyon, France, she won a silver medal in the Women's 200 m T34 and Women's 100 m T34. After collecting the bronze medal she commented I have dystonia which causes spasms in my hands and that means that the 100m is never my favourite event because getting my arms back can be quite difficult. Today, for example, I missed the first 10 or so pushes and that's something that I have to learn to cope with. Hopefully the program for Rio includes the 400m and the 800m, but if that doesn’t happen I will keep working to do even better in the short sprints when we get there. She attributed her improved performances to her new coach Louise Sauvage.

At the 2016 Rio Summer Paralympics Little competed in three T34 track events, the 100m, 400m and 800m. The 100m sprint was her first event on day three of the games. She placed 5th with a time of 19.05, commenting afterwards that it wasn't her best performance, "I had quite a bad start and the 100 not being my best event, I took a while to get going", she said. In the 400m event she placed 4th with a time of 1:01.91 and the 800m she also placed 4th with a time of 2:04.10.

She has transferred to the shot put F52 for the 2020 Summer Paralympics and in 2021 is coached by Karyne Di Marco and Breanne Clement. She came 5th in Women's Shot Put F32.

At the 2022 Commonwealth Games, she finished 6th in the Women's 100m T34.

Little won the bronze medal in the Women's Shot Put F32 at the 2023 World Para Athletics Championships in Paris. At the 2024 Paris Paralympics, she finished sixth in the Women's Shot put F32 and 13th in the Women's Club throw with an Oceania record.

In 2024, she is coached by Breanne Clement.
