= T34 (classification) =

Para-athletics classification

T34 is a disability sport classification for disability athletics. The classification is one of eight specifically for athletes with cerebral palsy, and one of four for athletes with cerebral palsy who use a wheelchair. People in this class have hypertonia, ataxia and athetosis. This class includes people who have cerebral palsy, or who have had a stroke or traumatic brain injury.

== Definition ==
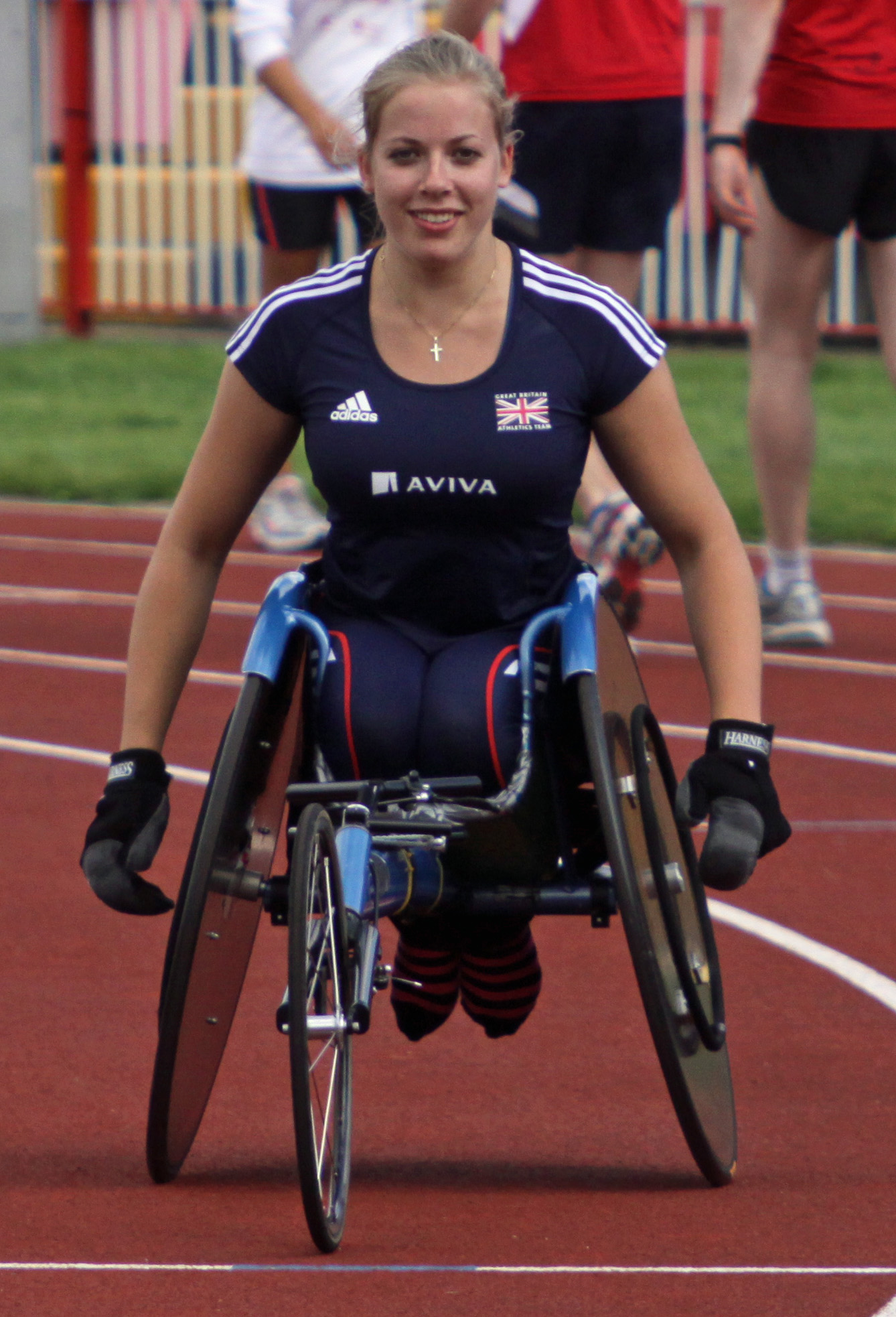
T34 competitor Hannah Lucy Cockroft

This classification is for disability athletics. This classification is one of eight classifications for athletes with cerebral palsy, four for wheelchair athletes (T31, T32, T33, T34) and four for ambulant ones (T35, T36, T37 and T38). Jane Buckley, writing for the Sporting Wheelies, describes the athletes in this classification as: "CP4, see CP-ISRA classes (appendix) Wheelchair". The classification in the appendix by Buckley goes on to say "The athlete has minimal limitations or control problems in their arms and trunk while pushing a wheelchair." The Australian Paralympic Committee defines this classification as being for "Moderate to severe problems in lower limbs, good functional strength and minimal control problems in upper limbs and torso". According to International Paralympic Committee 2011 rules, an ambulant athlete with spastic diplegia featuring lower limb spasticity Grade 3 is eligible to compete in either the T35 classification (running) or as a wheelchair racer in T34. The International Paralympic Committee defined this classification on their website in July 2016 as, "Coordination impairments (hypertonia, ataxia and athetosis)".

== Disability groups ==
Multiple types of disabilities are eligible to compete in this class. This class includes people who have cerebral palsy, or who have had a stroke or traumatic brain injury.

=== Cerebral palsy ===
==== CP4 ====
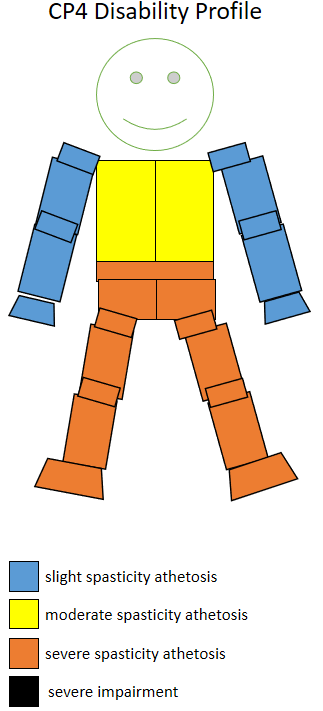
The spasticity athetosis level and location of a CP4 sportsperson.

On a daily basis, CP4 sportspeople in this class are likely to use a wheelchair. Some may be ambulant with the use of assistive devices. They have minimal control problems in upper limbs and torso, and good upper body strength. Head movement and trunk function differentiate this class from CP3. Lack of symmetry in arm movement are another major difference between the two classes, with CP3 competitors having less symmetry.

While they may be able to walk with assistance, F34 competitors throw from a fixed seated position.

== Performance and rules ==
Wheelchairs used by this class have three wheels, with a maximum rear height of 70 centimetres (28 in) and maximum front height of 50 centimetres (20 in). Chairs cannot have mirrors or any gears. They are not allowed to have anything protruding from the back of the chair. Officials can check for this by placing the chair against a wall, where the rear wheels should touch it without obstruction. As opposed to wearing hip numbers, racers in this class wear them on the helmet. Instead of wearing bibs, these numbers are put on the back of the racing chair and the racer.

The verbal starting commands for this class are different because it is a wheelchair class. For "On your marks" should be used to indicate that the athlete should approach or be at the starting line. "Set" means the athlete should take their final starting position. At this time, the front wheel should be touching the ground behind the starting line. At this stage, no further movement is allowed until the starting gun is fired. Movement is then allowed at "Go" or when the starting pistol is fired. Because this is a wheelchair class, different rules apply for overtaking with the responsibility lying with the racer coming from behind. They must be completely clear of the front wheel of the racer they are overtaking before cutting in front of them. The racer being overtaken cannot deliberately obstruct or impede the racer doing the overtaking. If a crash occurs within the first 50 meters of a race that is 800 meters or longer, the starting official has the option of recalling the race. In races in the United States, a race official's job for a crash is only to direct other racers around the accident 30 meters ahead of the accident.

In relay events involve this class, each team has two lanes. Racers don't use a baton, but instead transfer via touch of the body in the exchange zone. The incoming racer cannot use their momentum to push and give the ongoing racer any acceleration. The acceleration zone is 20 meters, with the take over zone being 20 meters.

In wheelchair races, the winner and time is determined by when the center of the front axle goes across the finish line.

Athletes in this class used secure frames for throwing events. The frame can be only one of two shapes: A rectangle or square. The sides must be at least 30 centimetres (12 in) long. The seat needs to be lower at the back or level, and it cannot be taller than 75 centimetres (30 in). This height includes any cushioning or padding. Throwers can have footplates on their frames, but the footplate can only be used for stability. It cannot be used to push off from. Rests can be used on the frame but they need to be present only for safety reasons and to aide in athlete stability. They need to be manufactured from rigid materials that do not move. These materials may include steel or aluminum. The backrest can have cushioning but it cannot be thicker than 5 centimetres (2.0 in). It cannot have any movable parts. The frame can also have a holding bar. The holding bar needs to be round or square, and needs to be a single straight piece. Athletes are not required to use a holding bar during their throw, and they can hold on to any part of the frame during their throw. Throwing frames should be inspected prior to the event. This should be done either in the call room or in the competition area. In general, people in this class should be allocated around 2 minutes to set up their chair.

Athletes need to throw from a seated position. They cannot throw from an inclined or other position. Doing so could increase the contribution of their legs and benefit their performance. Their legs must be in contact with the seat during the throw. If an athlete throws from a non-seated position, this is counted as a foul. People in this class cannot put tape on their hands. All straps used to hold the athlete to the frame must be non-elastic. While in the process of throwing, an athlete cannot touch a tie-down for the frame. Because of visibility issues for officials, athletes cannot wear loose clothing and they can ask athletes to tuck in clothing if they feel there is any issue with visibility. In throwing events at the Paralympic Games and World Championships, athletes get three trial throws. After that, the top 8 throwers get an additional three throws. For other events, organizers generally have the option to use that formula to give all throwers six consecutive throws. The total number of warm-up throws is at the discretion of the meet director.

== Events ==
Events that may be on the program for T34 competitors include the club, discus throw, shot put and javelin. Relay events available to this class internationally include the 4 x 100 meters and the 4 x 400 meters. The 4 x 100 meters and the 4 x 400 meters are also available in national competitions in the United States. Junior relays in the United States include the 4 x 100 meters, the 4 x 400 meters, and the 800 meter medley of 100, 100, 200 and 400 meters.

== History ==
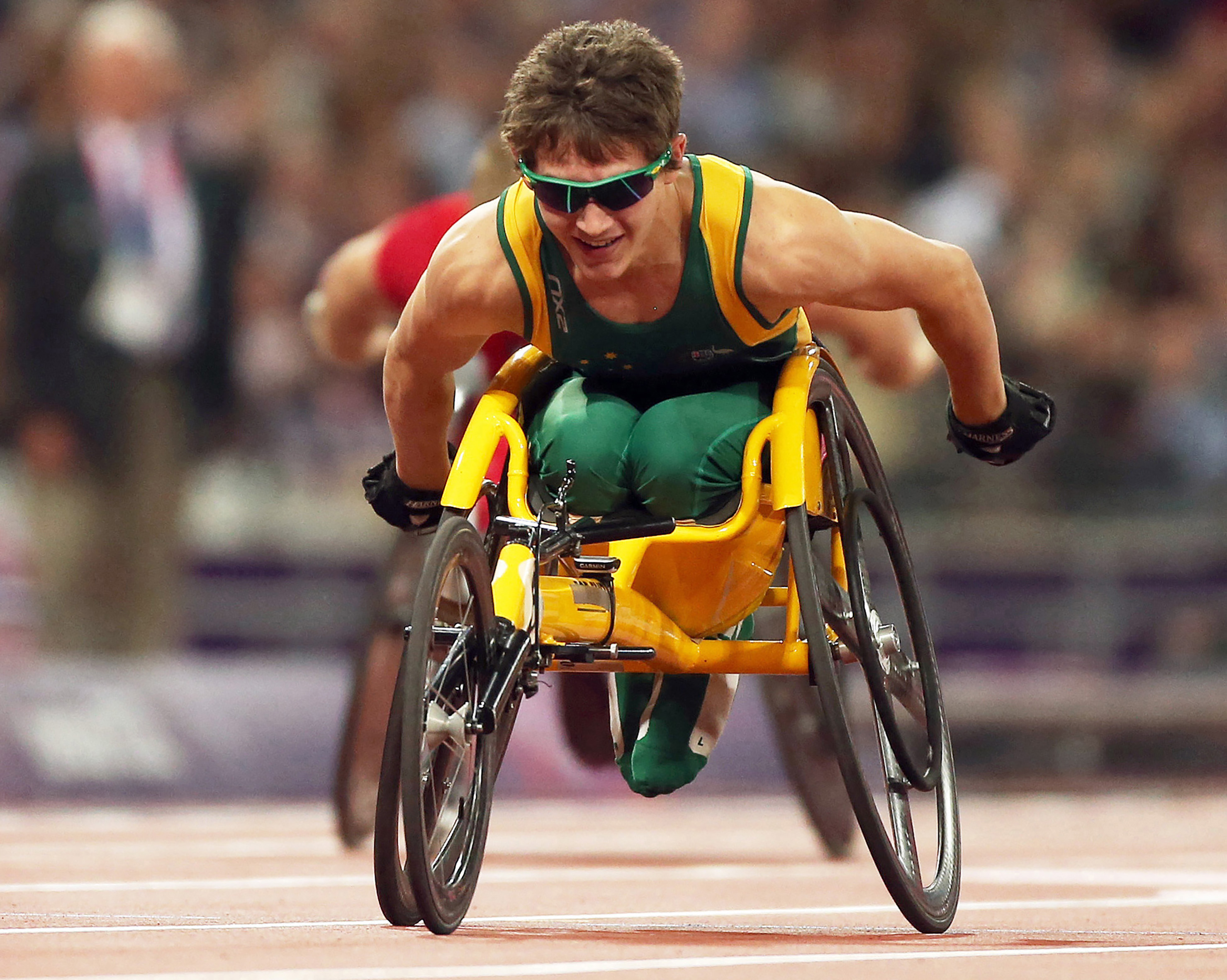
Australian T34 competitor Rheed McCracken

The classification was created by the International Paralympic Committee and has roots in a 2003 attempt to address "the overall objective to support and co-ordinate the ongoing development of accurate, reliable, consistent and credible sport focused classification systems and their implementation."

For the 2016 Summer Paralympics in Rio, the International Paralympic Committee had a zero classification at the Games policy. This policy was put into place in 2014, with the goal of avoiding last minute changes in classes that would negatively impact athlete training preparations. All competitors needed to be internationally classified with their classification status confirmed prior to the Games, with exceptions to this policy being dealt with on a case-by-case basis. In case there was a need for classification or reclassification at the Games despite best efforts otherwise, athletics classification was scheduled for September 4 and September 5 at Olympic Stadium. For sportspeople with physical or intellectual disabilities going through classification or reclassification in Rio, their in competition observation event is their first appearance in competition at the Games.

== Governance ==
Classification into this class is handled by the International Paralympic Committee. For national events, classification is handled by the national athletics organization.

== Becoming classified ==
Athletes with cerebral palsy or similar impairments who wish to compete in para-athletics competition must first undergo a classification assessment. During this, they both undergo a bench test of muscle coordination and demonstrate their skills in athletics, such as pushing a racing wheelchair and throwing. A determination is then made as to what classification an athlete should compete in. Classifications may be Confirmed or Review status. For athletes who do not have access to a full classification panel, Provisional classification is available; this is a temporary Review classification, considered an indication of class only, and generally used only in lower levels of competition.

== Competitors ==
Australian athletics competitors in this class include Rheed McCracken, Rosemary Little and Kristy Pond.
