= Athletics at the 2016 Summer Paralympics – Men's 200 metres =

The Men's 200m athletics events for the 2016 Summer Paralympics take place at the Estádio Olímpico João Havelange from September 8 to September 16, 2016. A total of 15 events were contested over this distance for 19 different classifications.

== Schedule ==
Event↓/Date →	Thu 8	Fri 9	Sat 10	Sun 11	Mon 12	Tue 13	Wed 14	Thu 15	Fri 16	Sat 17
T11 200 metres								F		
T12 200 metres										F
T35 200 metres					F					
T42 200 metres				F						
T44 200 metres					F					

== Medal summary ==
Classification	Gold		Silver		Bronze	
T11	Ananias Shikongo guide : Even Tjiviju; Namibia	22.44 PR	Felipe Gomes guide : Jonas De Lima Silva; Brazil	22.52	Daniel Silva guide : Heitor Sales; Brazil	23.04
T12	Leinier Savon Pineda; Cuba	22.23 PB	Hilton Langenhoven; South Africa	22.43	Mahdi Afri; Morocco	22.57
T35	Ihor Tsvietov; Ukraine	25.11	Fábio da Silva Bordignon; Brazil	26.01	Hernan Barreto; Argentina	26,50
T42	Richard Whitehead; Great Britain	23.39	Ntando Mahlangu; South Africa	23.77	David Henson; Great Britain	24.74
T44 (inc. T43)	Liam Malone; New Zealand	21.06 PR	Hunter Woodhall; United States	21.12 PB	David Behre; Germany	21.41

== Results ==
The following were the results of the finals of each of the Men's 200 metres events in each of the classifications. Further details of each event are available on that event's dedicated page.

=== T11 ===
The T11 category is for athletes with a visual impairment. A T11 athlete may be entirely without sight, or be able to perceive light, but have no ability to see the shape of a hand at any distance. T11 athletes commonly run with guides. 17:51 15 September 2016:

Rank	Lane	Bib	Name	Nationality	Reaction	Time	Notes
1st place, gold medalist(s)	3	1911	Ananias Shikongo	Namibia	0.183	22.44	
2nd place, silver medalist(s)	5	1146	Felipe Gomes	Brazil	0.203	22.52	
3rd place, bronze medalist(s)	7	1167	Daniel Silva	Brazil	0.167	23.04	
4	1	1242	Zetan Fan	China	0.164	23.24	

=== T12 ===
The T12 category is for athletes with visual impairment. Athletes in this category will generally have some residual sight, the ability to recognise the shape of a hand at a distance of 2 metres and the ability to perceive clearly will be no more than 2/60. T12 athletes commonly run with guides. The T34 category is for wheelchair athletes with cerebral palsy. Athletes in this category have minimal limitations or control problems in their arms and trunk while pushing a wheelchair. 19:03 17 September 2016:

Rank	Lane	Bib	Name	Nationality	Reaction	Time	Notes
1st place, gold medalist(s)	5	1354	Leinier Savon Pineda	Cuba	0.191	22.23	
2nd place, silver medalist(s)	3	2084	Hilton Langenhoven	South Africa	0.189	22.43	
3rd place, bronze medalist(s)	7	1846	Mahdi Afri	Morocco	0.148	22.57	
4	1	2393	Mansur Abdirashidov	Uzbekistan	0.148	22.69	

=== T35 ===
The T35 category is for ambulant athletes with cerebral palsy. The typical T35 athlete may need assistive devices for walking. The athlete may have sufficient function to run but demonstrates poor balance. 10:50 12 September 2016:

Rank	Lane	Bib	Name	Nationality	Reaction	Time	Notes
1st place, gold medalist(s)	5	2330	Ihor Tsvietov	Ukraine		25.11	
2nd place, silver medalist(s)	3	1140	Fabio da Silva Bordignon	Brazil		26.01	
3rd place, bronze medalist(s)	4	1034	Hernan Barreto	Argentina		26.50	
4	6	1036	Diego Martin Gonzalez	Argentina		27.21	
5	8	2361	Ayden Jent	United States		27.45	
6	2	1032	Nicolas Martin Aravena	Argentina		27.51	
7	7	1508	Jordan Howe	Great Britain		27.62	
8	1	1962	Jacob Phillips	New Zealand		29.10	

=== T42 ===
The T42 category is for single above-knee amputees and athletes with other impairments that are comparable to a single above knee amputation, including athletes with loss of muscle power in the lower limbs. 19:08 11 September 2016:

Rank	Lane	Bib	Name	Nationality	Reaction	Time	Notes
1st place, gold medalist(s)	6	1524	Richard Whitehead	Great Britain		23.39	
2nd place, silver medalist(s)	4	2085	Ntando Mahlangu	South Africa		23.77	
3rd place, bronze medalist(s)	7	1507	David Henson	Great Britain		24.74	
4	3	2381	Shaquille Vance	United States		24.86	
5	8	1382	Daniel Wagner	Denmark		25.20	
6	5	2387	Regas Woods	United States		25.27	
7	2	2164	Anil Prasanna Jayalath Yodha Pedige	Sri Lanka		25.96	
8	1	2151	Upul Indika Chuladasa Abarana Gedara	Sri Lanka		26.68	

=== T44 ===
The T44 category is for athletes who have a single below knee amputation or who can walk with moderately reduced function in one or both legs.

19:21 12 September 2016:

Rank	Lane	Bib	Name	Nationality	Reaction	Time	Notes
1st place, gold medalist(s)	4	1960	Liam Malone	New Zealand		21.06	
2nd place, silver medalist(s)	6	2386	Hunter Woodhall	United States		21.12	
3rd place, bronze medalist(s)	5	1537	David Behre	Germany		21.41	
4	7	1540	Johannes Floors	Germany		21.81	
5	3	2350	Aj Digby	United States		21.93	
6	8	2367	David Prince	United States		22.01	
7	2	1573	Michail Seitis	Greece		23.63	
	1	1551	Felix Streng	Germany			DSQ
