= Athletics at the 2024 Summer Paralympics – Men's 100 metres T64 =

Men's 100 metres T64 at the XVII Paralympic Games
- Venue: Stade de France
- Dates: 1 September 2024 (round 1); 2 September 2024 (final)
- Competitors: 18 from 12 nations
- Winning time: 10.65 PR, PB

Medalists
1st place, gold medalist(s)		Sherman Guity	Costa Rica
2nd place, silver medalist(s)		Maxcel Amo Manu	Italy
3rd place, bronze medalist(s)		Felix Streng	Germany

100 metres at the 2024 Summer Paralympics
Men · T11 · T12 · T13 · T34 · T35 · T36 · T37 · T38 · T44 · T47 · T51 · T52 · T53 · T54 · T63 · T64
Women · T11 · T12 · T13 · T34 · T35 · T36 · T37 · T38 · T47 · T53 · T54 · T63 · T64

The men's 100 metres T64 event at the 2024 Summer Paralympics in Paris, took place on 1 and 2 September 2024.

== Records ==
Prior to the competition, the existing records were as follows:

T62
World record	Johannes Floors (GER)	10.54	(United Arab Emirates) Dubai	10 November 2019
Paralympic record	Johannes Floors (GER)	10.79	(Japan) Tokyo	30 August 2021

Area	Time		Athlete	Location	Date
Africa	11.33		(South Africa) Paul Daniels	(Germany) Leverkusen	6 July 2024
America	10.75		(United States) Hunter Woodhall	(United States) Miramar	19 July 2024
Asia	12.64		(Thailand) Jafa Seapla	(Switzerland) Nottwil	27 May 2022
Europe	10.54	WR	(Germany) Johannes Floors	(United Arab Emirates) Dubai	10 November 2019
Oceania	Vacant				

T64
World record	Richard Browne (USA)	10.61	(Qatar) Doha	29 October 2015
Paralympic record	Felix Streng (GER)	10.72	(Japan) Tokyo	29 August 2021

Area	Time		Athlete	Location	Date
Africa	10.93		(South Africa) Arnu Fourie	(Qatar) Doha	29 October 2015
America	10.61	WR	(United States) Richard Browne	(Qatar) Doha	29 October 2015
Asia	11.27		(Japan) Kengo Oshima	(China) Hangzhou	26 October 2023
Europe	10.64		(Italy) Maxcel Amo Manu	(France) Paris	11 July 2023
Oceania	11.86		(New Zealand) Mitchell Joynt	(New Zealand) Hastings	5 March 2022

== Results ==
=== Round 1 ===
First 3 in each heat (Q) and the next 2 fastest (q) advance to the Final.

==== Heat 1 ====
Rank	Lane	Athlete	Nation	Time	Notes
1	1	Sherman Guity	Costa Rica	10.72	Q, =PR, SB
2	7	Felix Streng	Germany	10.79	Q
3	6	Jonnie Peacock	Great Britain	10.93	Q
4	5	Paul Daniels	South Africa	11.23	AR
5	4	Kengo Oshima	Japan	11.24	AR
6	8	Jonathan Gore	United States	11.34	
7	2	Andre Fortes	Brazil	11.43	PB
8	3	Fabio Bottazzini	Italy	11.76	
9	9	Antonio Flores	Malta	13.07	SB
Source:				Wind: 0.0 m/s	

==== Heat 2 ====
Rank	Lane	Athlete	Nation	Time	Notes
1	7	Maxcel Amo Manu	Italy	10.69	Q, PR, SB
2	6	Johannes Floors	Germany	10.92	Q
3	9	Hunter Woodhall	United States	11.02	Q
4	1	Olivier Hendriks	Netherlands	11.12	q
5	2	Alan Oliveira	Brazil	11.22	q
6	5	Derek Loccident	United States	11.29	PB
7	8	Daniel du Plessis	South Africa	11.75	
8	4	Pea Soe	Myanmar	11.89	SB
9	3	Arz Zahreddine	Lebanon	12.30	
Source:				Wind: -0.1 m/s	

=== Final ===
Rank	Lane	Athlete	Nation	Time	Notes
1st place, gold medalist(s)	7	Sherman Guity	Costa Rica	10.65	PR, PB
2nd place, silver medalist(s)	5	Maxcel Amo Manu	Italy	10.76	
3rd place, bronze medalist(s)	6	Felix Streng	Germany	10.77	
4	4	Johannes Floors	Germany	10.85	
5	3	Jonnie Peacock	Great Britain	10.91	
6	8	Hunter Woodhall	United States	10.96	
7	9	Olivier Hendriks	Netherlands	11.15	
8	2	Alan Oliveira	Brazil	11.22	
Source:				Wind: +0.2 m/s	
