= Athletics at the 2016 Summer Paralympics – Men's 200 metres T44 =

Men's 200 metres T44 at the XV Paralympic Games
- Venue: Estádio Olímpico João Havelange
- Dates: 11–12 September 2016
- Competitors: 13 from 9 nations

Medalists
1st place, gold medalist(s)		Liam Malone	New Zealand
2nd place, silver medalist(s)		Hunter Woodhall	United States
3rd place, bronze medalist(s)		David Behre	Germany

The Athletics at the 2016 Summer Paralympics – Men's 200 metres T44 event at the 2016 Paralympic Games took place on 11–12 September 2016, at the Estádio Olímpico João Havelange.

The T44 category is for athletes who have a single below knee amputation or who can walk with moderately reduced function in one or both legs.

== Heats ==
=== Heat 1 ===
20:03 11 September 2016:

Rank	Lane	Bib	Name	Nationality	Reaction	Time	Notes
1	4	1537	David Behre	Germany		21.63	Q
2	8	2350	Aj Digby	United States		22.14	Q
3	2	2367	David Prince	United States		22.42	Q
4	7	1551	Felix Streng	Germany		22.55	q
5	6	2082	Arnu Fourie	South Africa		22.67	
6	5	2154	Ajith Prasanna Kumar Hettiarachchi	Sri Lanka		24.58	
7	3	1992	Jose Luis Casas	Peru		26.91	

=== Heat 2 ===
20:10 11 September 2016:

Rank	Lane	Bib	Name	Nationality	Reaction	Time	Notes
1	3	1960	Liam Malone	New Zealand		21.33	Q
2	5	2386	Hunter Woodhall	United States		21.50	Q
3	7	1540	Johannes Floors	Germany		21.86	Q
4	8	1573	Michail Seitis	Greece		22.45	q
5	4	1154	Alan Fonteles Cardoso Oliveira	Brazil		22.63	
6	6	1708	Emanuele di Marino	Italy		24.74	

== Final ==
19:21 12 September 2016:

Rank	Lane	Bib	Name	Nationality	Reaction	Time	Notes
1st place, gold medalist(s)	4	1960	Liam Malone	New Zealand		21.06	
2nd place, silver medalist(s)	6	2386	Hunter Woodhall	United States		21.12	
3rd place, bronze medalist(s)	5	1537	David Behre	Germany		21.41	
4	7	1540	Johannes Floors	Germany		21.81	
5	3	2350	Aj Digby	United States		21.93	
6	8	2367	David Prince	United States		22.01	
7	2	1573	Michail Seitis	Greece		23.63	
	1	1551	Felix Streng	Germany			DSQ
