= 2015 IPC Athletics World Championships – Men's 4 × 100 metres relay =

The men's 4x100 metres relay at the 2015 IPC Athletics World Championships was held at the Suheim Bin Hamad Stadium in Doha from 22–31 October.

== Medalists ==
Event	Gold		Silver		Bronze	
T11-13	Fedor Trikolich (T12); Aleksei Labzin (T13); Artem Loginov (T12); Andrey Koptev (T11); Guide: Sergey Petrchenko; Russia	42.11 WR	Miran Sahatov (T11); Guide: Valentin Bulichev; Mansur Abdirashidov (T12); Ulugbek Chariev (T12); Fakhriddin Khamraev (T13); Uzbekistan	43.71 NR	Martin Parejo Maza (T11); Guide: Timoteo Stewart Ortiz; Diego Sancho Villanueva (T13); Gerard Descarrega Puigdevall (T11); Guide: Marcos Blanquino Exposito; Joan Munar Martinez(T12); Spain	44.24
T42-47	Markus Rehm (T44); David Behre (T43); Felix Streng (T44); Johannes Floors (T43); Germany	41.86 AR	Trenten Merrill (T44); David Prince (T44); Roderick Townsend-Roberts (T46); Richard Browne (T44); United States	42.91 SB	Anton Prokhorov (T42); Alexey Kotlov (T47); Vadim Trunov (T47); Vadim Aleshkin(T44); Russia	44.27 NR
WR world record | AR area record | CR championship record | GR games record | NR national record | OR Olympic record | PB personal best | SB season best | WL world leading (in a given season)

== See also ==
- List of IPC world records in athletics
