= Germany at the 2016 Summer Paralympics =

- IPC code: GER
- NPC: National Paralympic Committee Germany
- Website: www.dbs-npc.de (in German)

in Rio de Janeiro
- Competitors: 155 in 14 sports
- Medals Ranked 6th: Gold 18 Silver 25 Bronze 14 Total 57

Summer Paralympics appearances (overview)
- 1960; 1964; 1968; 1972; 1976; 1980; 1984; 1988; 1992; 1996; 2000; 2004; 2008; 2012; 2016; 2020; 2024

Other related appearances
- East Germany (1984)

Germany competed at the 2016 Summer Paralympics in Rio de Janeiro, Brazil, from 7 September to 18 September 2016. The first places the team qualified were for four athletes in sailing events. They also qualified athletes in archery, cycling, equestrian, paracanoeing, paratriathlon, rowing and wheelchair basketball.

== Funding ==
One source of funding and support for Germany's Paralympic efforts through to the Rio Games is a local partnership with Allianz.

== Disability classifications ==
Every participant at the Paralympics has their disability grouped into one of five disability categories; amputation, the condition may be congenital or sustained through injury or illness; cerebral palsy; wheelchair athletes, there is often overlap between this and other categories; visual impairment, including blindness; Les autres, any physical disability that does not fall strictly under one of the other categories, for example dwarfism or multiple sclerosis. Each Paralympic sport then has its own classifications, dependent upon the specific physical demands of competition. Events are given a code, made of numbers and letters, describing the type of event and classification of the athletes competing. Some sports, such as athletics, divide athletes by both the category and severity of their disabilities, other sports, for example swimming, group competitors from different categories together, the only separation being based on the severity of the disability.

== Medalists ==
Medal	Name	Sport	Event
Gold	David Behre; Johannes Floors; Markus Rehm; Felix Streng	Athletics	Men's 4 × 100 m relay T43-47
Gold	Heinrich Popow	Athletics	Men's long jump F42
Gold	Markus Rehm	Athletics	Men's long jump F44
Gold	Daniel Scheil	Athletics	Men's shot put F33
Gold	Sebastian Dietz	Athletics	Men's shot put F36
Gold	Niko Kappel	Athletics	Men's shot put F41
Gold	Vanessa Low	Athletics	Women's long jump F42
Gold	Birgit Kober	Athletics	Women's shot put F36
Gold	Franziska Liebhardt	Athletics	Women's shot put F37
Gold	Michael Teuber	Cycling	Men's road time trial H4
Gold	Hans-Peter Durst	Cycling	Men's road time trial T1-2
Gold	Vico Merklein	Cycling	Men's road race H4
Gold	Steffen Warias	Cycling	Men's road race C1-3
Gold	Hans-Peter Durst	Cycling	Men's road race T1-2
Gold	Dorothee Vieth	Cycling	Women's road time trial H4-5
Gold	Christiane Reppe	Cycling	Women's road race H1-4
Gold	Andrea Eskau	Cycling	Women's road race H5
Gold	Martin Schulz	Paratriathlon	Men's individual PT4
Silver	David Behre	Athletics	Men's 400m T44
Silver	Claudia Nicoleitzik	Athletics	Women's 100m T36
Silver	Vanessa Low	Athletics	Women's 100m T42
Silver	Irmgard Bensusan	Athletics	Women's 100m T44
Silver	Irmgard Bensusan	Athletics	Women's 200m T44
Silver	Irmgard Bensusan	Athletics	Women's 400m T44
Silver	Franziska Liebhardt	Athletics	Women's long jump F37
Silver	Marianne Buggenhagen	Athletics	Women's discus throw F55
Silver	Martina Willing	Athletics	Women's javelin throw F56
Silver	Maximilian Weber	Cycling	Men's road race H3
Silver	Andrea Eskau	Cycling	Women's road time trial H4-5
Silver	Denise Schindler	Cycling	Women's road time trial C1-3
Silver	Elke Philipp; Alina Rosenberg; Carolin Schnarre; Steffen Zeibig	Equestrian	Mixed team
Silver	Carmen Brussig	Judo	Women's -48kg
Silver	Ramona Brussig	Judo	Women's -52kg
Silver	Tom Kierey	Paracanoeing	Men's KL3
Silver	Edina Muller	Paracanoeing	Women's KL1
Silver	Natascha Hiltrop	Shooting	Mixed 10m air rifle prone SH1
Silver	Denise Grahl	Swimming	Women's 50m freestyle S7
Silver	Naomi Maike Schnittger	Swimming	Women's 50m freestyle S12
Silver	Thomas Schmidberger	Table tennis	Men's singles class 3
Silver	Valentin Baus	Table tennis	Men's singles class 5
Silver	Thomas Bruchle; Thomas Schmidberger	Table tennis	Men's team class 3
Silver	Steffi Grebe	Table tennis	Women's singles class 6
Bronze	Thomas Ulbricht	Athletics	Men's 100m T12
Bronze	Felix Streng	Athletics	Men's 100m T44
Bronze	David Behre	Athletics	Men's 200m T44
Bronze	Felix Streng	Athletics	Men's long jump F44
Bronze	Katrin Mueller-Rottgardt	Athletics	Women's 100m T12
Bronze	Claudia Nicoleitzik	Athletics	Women's 200m T36
Bronze	Frances Herrmann	Athletics	Women's javelin throw F34
Bronze	Vico Merklein	Cycling	Men's road time trial H4
Bronze	Denise Schindler	Cycling	Women's road race C1-3
Bronze	Jana Majunke	Cycling	Women's road race T1-2
Bronze	Kai-Christian Kruse	Cycling	Men's 1km time trial B
Bronze	Steffen Zeibig	Equestrian	Individual freestyle test grade II
Bronze	Nikolai Kornhass	Judo	Men's -73kg
Bronze	Torben Schmidtke	Swimming	Men's 100m breaststroke SB6

== Archery ==
Jennifer Hess earned Germany a spot at the Rio Games following her performance at the 2015 World Archery Para Championships. She qualified the country after her performance in the recurve women's open event. Uwe Herter earned Germany a second spot in the W1 men's event.

Athlete	Event	Ranking round		Round of 32	Round of 16	Quarterfinals	Semifinals	Final / BM	
Athlete	Event	Score	Seed	Opposition Score	Opposition Score	Opposition Score	Opposition Score	Opposition Score	Rank
Uwe Herter	Men's individual compound W1	609	8	—N/a	Cavanagh (GBR); W 130–124	Aşık (TUR); W 130–124	Walker (GBR); L 131–135	Kinik (SVK); L 125–133	4
Maik Szarszewski	Men's individual recurve open	629	3	De Souza (BRA); W 7–1	Shi (CHN); W 7–3	Rezende (BRA); L 4–6	Did not advance		
Lucia Kupczyk	Women's individual compound open	607	15	Abbaspour (IRI); L 129–140	Did not advance				
Jennifer Hess	Women's individual recurve open	594	11	Floreno (ITA); L 4–6	Did not advance				
Maik Szarszewski; Jennifer Hess	Team recurve open	1223	6	—N/a	Mongolia (MGL); L 3–5	Did not advance			

== Athletics ==
Men
Track & road events

Athlete	Event	Heat		Semifinal		Final	
Athlete	Event	Result	Rank	Result	Rank	Result	Rank
Alhassane Balde	800 metres T54	1:37.30	5	—N/a		Did not advance	
Alhassane Balde	1500 metres T54	3:07.14	3 Q	—N/a		3:01.62	6
Alhassane Balde	5000 metres T54	10:21.67	6 q	—N/a		11:03.00	8
David Behre	100 metres T44	11.23	3 Q	—N/a		11.26	7
David Behre	200 metres T44	21.63	1 Q	—N/a		21.41	3rd place, bronze medalist(s)
David Behre	400 metres T44	47.74	1 Q	—N/a		46.23	2nd place, silver medalist(s)
Johannes Floors	100 metres T44	11.34	6	—N/a		Did not advance	
Johannes Floors	200 metres T44	21.86	3 Q	—N/a		21.81	4
Johannes Floors	400 metres T44	DSQ		—N/a		Did not advance	
Heinrich Popow	100 metres T42	12.45	1 Q	—N/a		12.46	4
Dennis Rill	100 metres T38	12.03	5	—N/a		Did not advance	
Leon Schäfer	100 metres T42	13.16	7	—N/a		Did not advance	
Denis Schmitz	100 metres T33	—N/a				21.22	6
Marc Schuh	100 metres T54	15.26	4	—N/a		Did not advance	
Marc Schuh	400 metres T54	48.89	4	—N/a		Did not advance	
Felix Streng	100 metres T44	11.12	3 Q	—N/a		11.03	3rd place, bronze medalist(s)
Felix Streng	200 metres T44	22.55	4 q	—N/a		DSQ	
Thomas Ulbricht	100 metres T12	11.40	1 Q	—N/a		11.39	3rd place, bronze medalist(s)
Thomas Ulbricht	200 metres T12	DSQ		Did not advance			
Thomas Ulbricht	400 metres T12	50.77	2 q	51.40	3	Did not advance	
Markus Rehm; David Behre; Felix Streng; Johannes Floors	4 × 100 metres relay T43-47	—N/a				40.82 PR	1st place, gold medalist(s)

Field events

Athlete	Event	Final	
Athlete	Event	Distance	Position
Reinhold Bötzel	High jump T47	1.80 =SB	9
Sebastian Dietz	Shot put F36	14.84	1st place, gold medalist(s)
Niko Kappel	Shot put F41	13.57	1st place, gold medalist(s)
Mathias Mester	Javelin throw F41	39.99	5
Heinrich Popow	Long jump T42	6.70 PR	1st place, gold medalist(s)
Markus Rehm	Long jump T44	8.21 PR	1st place, gold medalist(s)
Dennis Rill	Long jump T38	5.03	7
Leon Schäfer	Long jump T42	6.06 PB	4
Leon Schäfer	High jump T42	1.55	12
Daniel Scheil	Shot put F33	11.03	1st place, gold medalist(s)
Mathias Schulze	Javelin throw F46	48.84	10
Felix Streng	Long jump T44	7.13 PB	3rd place, bronze medalist(s)
Frank Tinnemeier	Shot put T42	13.44	5
Thomas Ulbricht	Long jump T12	6.40	10

Women
Track & road events

Athlete	Event	Heat		Semifinal		Final	
Athlete	Event	Result	Rank	Result	Rank	Result	Rank
Lindy Ave	100 metres T38	13.28	2 Q	—N/a		13.20	5
Irmgard Bensusan	100 metres T44	13.08	1 Q	—N/a		13.04	2nd place, silver medalist(s)
Irmgard Bensusan	200 metres T44	26.70	1 Q	—N/a		26.90	2nd place, silver medalist(s)
Irmgard Bensusan	400 metres T44	—N/a				59.62	2nd place, silver medalist(s)
Vanessa Braun	100 metres T38	14.59	7	—N/a		Did not advance	
Janne Sophie Engeleiter	100 metres T13	13.13	5	—N/a		Did not advance	
Isabelle Foerder	100 metres T37	15.04	5	—N/a		Did not advance	
Isabelle Foerder	400 metres T37	1:16.25	5	—N/a		Did not advance	
Maike Hausberger	400 metres T37	1:12.22	5	—N/a		Did not advance	
Vanessa Low	100 metres T42	15.76	1 Q	—N/a		15.17	2nd place, silver medalist(s)
Katrin Mueller-Rottgardt	100 metres T12	12.47	1 Q	12.11 PB	2 q	11.99 PB	3rd place, bronze medalist(s)
Katrin Mueller-Rottgardt	200 metres T12	24.73	2 q	—N/a		24.71	4
Claudia Nicoleitzik	100 metres T36	14.71	2 Q	—N/a		14.64	2nd place, silver medalist(s)
Claudia Nicoleitzik	200 metres T36	31.18	2 Q	—N/a		31.13	3rd place, bronze medalist(s)
Nicole Nicoleitzik	100 metres T38	14.49	6	—N/a		Did not advance	
Jana Schmidt	100 metres T42	16.70	3 Q	—N/a		16.84	6
Maria Seifert	100 metres T37	14.06	3 Q	—N/a		14.13	6
Uta Streckert	100 metres T35	—N/a				17.66	5
Uta Streckert	200 metres T35	—N/a				37.51	7
Lindy Ave; Maria Seifert; Nicole Nicoleitzik; Claudia Nicoleitzik	4 × 100 metres relay T35-38	—N/a				56.04 SB	4

Field events

Athlete	Event	Final	
Athlete	Event	Distance	Position
Lindy Ave	Long jump T38	4.47 PB	6
Vanessa Braun	Long jump T38	3.98 =PB	13
Marianne Buggenhagen	Discus throw F55	24.56	2nd place, silver medalist(s)
Maike Hausberger	Long jump T37	4.06	4
Frances Herrmann	Shot put F34	6.64	6
Frances Herrmann	Javelin throw F34	18.16	3rd place, bronze medalist(s)
Birgit Kober	Shot put F36	11.41	1st place, gold medalist(s)
Frederike Koleiski	Discus throw F44	30.34	4
Franziska Liebhardt	Long jump T37	4.42	2nd place, silver medalist(s)
Franziska Liebhardt	Shot put F37	13.96	1st place, gold medalist(s)
Vanessa Low	Long jump T42	4.93 WR	1st place, gold medalist(s)
Juliane Mogge	Shot put F36	9.12	4
Katrin Mueller-Rottgardt	Long jump T12	5.16	6
Nicole Nicoleitzik	Long jump T38	4.05	10
Jana Schmidt	Long jump T42	3.53	7
Martina Willing	Shot put F57	7.79	9
Martina Willing	Discus throw F57	21.05	9
Martina Willing	Javelin throw F57	22.22	2nd place, silver medalist(s)

== Paracanoe ==
Men

Athlete	Event	Heats		Semifinals		Final	
Athlete	Event	Time	Rank	Time	Rank	Time	Rank
Tom Kierey	KL3	42.345	1 F	Bye		39.909	2nd place, silver medalist(s)
Ivo Kilian	KL2	50.222	4 SF	49.737	4	48.622	8

Women

Athlete	Event	Heats		Semifinals		Final	
Athlete	Event	Time	Rank	Time	Rank	Time	Rank
Anke Molkenthin	KL2	1:05.721	5 SF	1:05.382	6	Did not advance	
Edina Müller	KL1	58.662	1 F	Bye		58.874	2nd place, silver medalist(s)

== Cycling ==
With one pathway for qualification being one highest ranked NPCs on the UCI Para-Cycling male and female Nations Ranking Lists on 31 December 2014, Germany qualified for the 2016 Summer Paralympics in Rio, assuming they continued to meet all other eligibility requirements.

=== Road ===
Men

Athlete	Event	Time	Rank
Hans-Peter Durst	Road race T1–2	50:07	1st place, gold medalist(s)
Hans-Peter Durst	Road time trial T1–2	22:57.34	1st place, gold medalist(s)
Kai Kruse	Road time trial B	42:48.42	20
Vico Merklein	Road race H4	1:28:48	1st place, gold medalist(s)
Vico Merklein	Road time trial H4	28:42.34	3rd place, bronze medalist(s)
Thomas Schäfer	Road race C4–5	2:19:26	12
Thomas Schäfer	Road time trial C4	40:05.05	7
Michael Teuber	Road race C1–3	1:52:09	14
Michael Teuber	Road time trial C1	27:53.98	1st place, gold medalist(s)
Steffen Warias	Road race C1–3	1:49:11	1st place, gold medalist(s)
Steffen Warias	Road time trial C3	40:38.45	5
Maximilian Weber	Road race H3	1:33:17	2nd place, silver medalist(s)
Maximilian Weber	Road time trial H3	31:20.94	9
Erich Winkler	Road race C1–3	1:55:04	18
Erich Winkler	Road time trial C1	29:37.37	4

Women

Athlete	Event	Time	Rank
Kerstin Brachtendorf	Road race C4–5	2:21:58	5
Kerstin Brachtendorf	Road time trial C5	30:31.46	7
Andrea Eskau	Road race H5	1:37:07	1st place, gold medalist(s)
Andrea Eskau	Road time trial H4–5	32:15.42	2nd place, silver medalist(s)
Jana Majunke	Road race T1–2	1:08:19	3rd place, bronze medalist(s)
Jana Majunke	Road time trial T1–2	27:43.46	4
Christiane Reppe	Road race H1–4	1:15:56	1st place, gold medalist(s)
Christiane Reppe	Road time trial H4–5	33:54.53	6
Denise Schindler	Road race C1–3	1:30:14	3rd place, bronze medalist(s)
Denise Schindler	Road time trial C1–3	30:18.99	2nd place, silver medalist(s)
Dorothee Vieth	Road race H5	1:37:15	5
Dorothee Vieth	Road time trial H4–5	31:35.46	1st place, gold medalist(s)

=== Track ===
Pursuit

Athlete	Event	Qualification		Final	
Athlete	Event	Time	Rank	Opponent Results	Rank
Kai Kruse	Men's individual pursuit B	4:45.603	13	Did not advance	
Michael Teuber	Men's individual pursuit C1	4:04.105	5	Did not advance	
Erich Winkler	Men's individual pursuit C1	4:02.658	3	Nijhuis (NED); L OVL	4
Kerstin Brachtendorf	Women's individual pursuit C5	4:01.233	8	Did not advance	
Denise Schindler	Women's individual pursuit C1–3	Disqualified		Did not advance	

Time trial

Athlete	Event	Time	Rank
Kai Kruse	Men's 1 km time trial B	1:01.787	3rd place, bronze medalist(s)
Erich Winkler	Men's 1 km time trial C1–3	1:17.774	21

== Equestrian ==
Germany were one of three nations to qualify a team for dressage via their results at the 2014 FEI World Equestrian Games, where they won the bronze medal in the team event. The country earned an additional individual slot via the Para Equestrian Individual Ranking List Allocation method following the suspension of Russia, and France Finland not using one of their allocated spots.

- Team Dressage – 4 quota places

Athlete	Horse	Event	Score	Rank
Elke Philipp	Regaliz	Individual championship test grade Ia	73.696	4
Elke Philipp	Regaliz	Individual freestyle test grade Ia	73.700	4
Alina Rosenberg	Nea's Daboun	Individual championship test grade Ib	70.966	5
Alina Rosenberg	Nea's Daboun	Individual freestyle test grade Ib	72.550	4
Carolin Schnarre	Del Rusch	Individual championship test grade IV	69.905	5
Carolin Schnarre	Del Rusch	Individual freestyle test grade IV	69.600	5
Claudia Schmidt	Romeo Royal	Individual championship test grade II	67.314	11
Steffen Zeibig	Feel Good 4	Individual championship test grade II	70.057	4
Steffen Zeibig	Feel Good 4	Individual freestyle test grade II	74.350	3rd place, bronze medalist(s)
Elke Philipp; Alina Rosenberg; Carolin Schnarre; Steffen Zeibig	See above	Team	433.321	2nd place, silver medalist(s)

== Goalball ==
Germany's men enter the tournament ranked 15th in the world.

The following is the Germany roster in the men's goalball tournament of the 2016 Summer Paralympics.

No.	Player	Class	Date of birth (age)
1	Michael Feistle	B2	13 October 1992 (aged 23)
3	Thomas Steiger	B2	31 July 1996 (aged 20)
4	Christian Friebel	B2	17 March 1989 (aged 27)
5	Stefan Hawranke	B2	1 January 1985 (aged 31)
6	Oliver Horauf	B2	13 November 1996 (aged 19)
7	Reno Tiede	B2	16 March 1990 (aged 26)

Pos	Team	Pld	W	D	L	GF	GA	GD	Pts	Qualification
1	Brazil (H)	4	4	0	0	42	15	+27	12	Quarter-finals
2	Sweden	4	3	0	1	33	23	+10	9	Quarter-finals
3	Germany	4	1	0	3	24	26	−2	3	Quarter-finals
4	Canada	4	1	0	3	26	39	−13	3	Quarter-finals
5	Algeria	4	1	0	3	25	47	−22	3	

Source: Paralympic.org
(H) Hosts

8 September 2016; 13:15	Algeria	0–10	Germany	Future Arena, Rio de Janeiro; Referees: Nejc Jakic (SLO), Daniel Voltan (BRA)
8 September 2016; 13:15		Report	Horauf 5 Feistle 4 Steiger 1	Future Arena, Rio de Janeiro; Referees: Nejc Jakic (SLO), Daniel Voltan (BRA)

10 September 2016; 17:30	Germany	5–7	Canada	Future Arena, Rio de Janeiro; Referees: Vilma Basinkaite (LTU), Raili Sipura (FIN)
10 September 2016; 17:30	Feistle 5	Report	Gaulin 6 Nesbitt 1	Future Arena, Rio de Janeiro; Referees: Vilma Basinkaite (LTU), Raili Sipura (FIN)

12 September 2016; 09:00	Sweden	9–5	Germany	Future Arena, Rio de Janeiro; Referees: Bülent Kimyon (TUR), Dawna Christy (CAN)
12 September 2016; 09:00	Björkstrand 4 Seremeti 3 Gahne 2	Report	Feistle 3 Horauf 2	Future Arena, Rio de Janeiro; Referees: Bülent Kimyon (TUR), Dawna Christy (CAN)

13 September 2016; 10:15	Germany	4–10	Brazil	Future Arena, Rio de Janeiro; Referees: Rudi Janssen (BEL), Raili Sipura (FIN)
13 September 2016; 10:15	Feistle 2 Horauf 2	Report	Sousa 4 Moreno 2 Celente 2 de Melo 2	Future Arena, Rio de Janeiro; Referees: Rudi Janssen (BEL), Raili Sipura (FIN)

Quarterfinal

14 September 2016; 12:00	United States	7–6	Germany	Future Arena, Rio de Janeiro; Referees: Daniel Voltan (BRA), Patricia Fras (SLO)
14 September 2016; 12:00	Merren 3 Hamilton 3 Kusku 1	Report	Steiger 3 Feistle 2 Horauf 1	Future Arena, Rio de Janeiro; Referees: Daniel Voltan (BRA), Patricia Fras (SLO)

== Judo ==
Men

Athlete	Event	Round of 16	Quarterfinals	Semifinals	Repechage 1	Repechage 2	Final / BM	
Athlete	Event	Opposition Result	Opposition Result	Opposition Result	Opposition Result	Opposition Result	Opposition Result	Rank
Nikolai Kornhass	−73 kg	Bye	Briceno (VEN); W 000–000^{1}	Gasimov (AZE); L 000–100	Bye		Kitazono (JPN); W 110–000	3rd place, bronze medalist(s)
Sebastian Junk	−81 kg	Nouri Jafari (IRI); L 000–111	Did notadvance					
Oliver Upmann	−100 kg	Tenorio (BRA); L 000–100	Did not advance		Skelley (GBR); L 000–100	Did not advance		

Women

Athlete	Event	Quarterfinals	Semifinals	Repechage	Final / BM	
Athlete	Event	Opposition Result	Opposition Result	Opposition Result	Opposition Result	Rank
Carmen Brussig	−48 kg	Tasin (TUR); W 100–000	Halinska (UKR); W 001–000	Bye	Li (CHN); L 000–100	2nd place, silver medalist(s)
Ramona Brussig	−52 kg	Ferreira (BRA); W 100–000	Salaeva (UZB); W 001–000	Bye	Martinet (FRA); L 000–012	2nd place, silver medalist(s)

== Paratriathlon ==
Athlete	Event	Swim (0.75 km)	Trans 1	Bike (22.28 km)	Trans 2	Run (5 km)	Total Time	Rank
Stefan Lösler	Men's PT2	12:07	2:24	40:16	1:22	21:15	1:17:24	7
Martin Schulz	Men's PT4	10:33	1:09	32:23	0:39	17:53	1:02:37	1st place, gold medalist(s)

== Rowing ==
One pathway for qualifying for Rio involved having a boat have top eight finish at the 2015 FISA World Rowing Championships in a medal event. Germany qualified for the 2016 Games under this criterion in the LTA Mixed Coxed Four event with a seventh-place finish in a time of 03:30.920.

Athlete	Event	Heats		Repechage		Semifinals		Final	
Athlete	Event	Time	Rank	Time	Rank	Time	Rank	Time	Rank
Johannes Schmidt	Men's single sculls	5:27.77	6 R	5:22.97	4 FB	Bye		5:12.14	11
Anke Molkenthin; Tino Kolitscher; Valentin Luz; Susanne Lackner; Inga Thöne	Mixed coxed four	3:31.59	3 R	3:35.68	1 FA	Bye		3:27.34	4

== Sailing ==
Germany qualified a boat for two of the three sailing classes at the Games through their results at the 2014 Disabled Sailing World Championships held in Halifax, Nova Scotia, Canada. Places were earned in the solo 2.4mR event and a crew also qualified for the three-person Sonar class.

Athlete	Event	Race											Net points	Final rank
Athlete	Event	1	2	3	4	5	6	7	8	9	10	11	Net points	Final rank
Heiko Kroeger	Norlin Mark 3 / 2.5 metre	2	3	5	11	2	10	7	6	~~15~~	2	7	55	6
Lasse Klötzing; Siegmund Mainka; Jens Kroker	Sonar	4	5	7	6	8	~~10~~	5	7	5	3	5	55	6

== Shooting ==
The first opportunity to qualify for shooting at the Rio Games took place at the 2014 IPC Shooting World Championships in Suhl. Shooters earned spots for their NPC. Germany earned a qualifying spot at this event in the R3 – 10Mm Air Rifle Prone Mixed SH1 event as a result of the performance Natascha Hiltrop. It was the only qualification spot Germany earned at the event.

The country sent shooters to 2015 IPC Shooting World Cup in Osijek, Croatia, where Rio direct qualification was also available. They earned a qualifying spot at this event based on the performance of Norbert Nau in the R1 – 10mAir Rifle Standing Men SH1 event.

The third opportunity for direct qualification for shooters to the Rio Paralympics took place at the 2015 IPC IPC Shooting World Cup in Sydney, Australia. At this competition, Joseph Neumaier earned a qualifying spot for their country in the R1 - Men's 10m Air Rifle Standing SH1 event.

The last direct qualifying event for Rio in shooting took place at the 2015 IPC Shooting World Cup in Fort Benning in November. Bernhard Fendt earned a qualifying spot for their country at this competition in the R6- Mixed 50m Rifle Prone SH1 event. Elke Seeiger gave Germany their last direct qualification spot for the Rio Games in shooting with her performance in the R8 - Women's 50m Rifle 3 Positions event.

Athlete	Event	Qualification		Semifinal		Final	
Athlete	Event	Points	Rank	Points	Rank	Points	Rank
Bernhard Fendt	Mixed 10 metre air rifle prone SH1	625.4	32	—N/a		Did not advance	
Bernhard Fendt	Mixed 50 metre rifle prone SH1	600.4	34	—N/a		Did not advance	
Norbert Gau	Men's 10 metre air rifle standing SH1	613.8	12	—N/a		Did not advance	
Natascha Hiltrop	Women's 10 metre air rifle standing SH1	400.5	12	—N/a		Did not advance	
Natascha Hiltrop	Women's 50 metre rifle 3 positions SH1	563	5	—N/a		390.9	7
Natascha Hiltrop	Mixed 10 metre air rifle prone SH1	634.3	5	—N/a		211.5	2nd place, silver medalist(s)
Natascha Hiltrop	Mixed 50 metre rifle prone SH1	612.8	13	—N/a		Did not advance	
Josef Neumaier	Men's 10 metre air rifle standing SH1	612.3	13	—N/a		Did not advance	
Josef Neumaier	Mixed 50 metre rifle 3 positions SH1	1136	11	—N/a		Did not advance	
Manuela Schmermund	Women's 10 metre air rifle standing SH1	399.1	16	—N/a		Did not advance	
Manuela Schmermund	Women's 50 metre rifle 3 positions SH1	558	7	—N/a		423.2	4
Manuela Schmermund	Mixed 50 metre rifle prone SH1	609.5	22	—N/a		Did not advance	
Elke Seeliger	Women's 10 metre air rifle standing SH1	401.6	11	—N/a		Did not advance	
Elke Seeliger	Women's 50 metre rifle 3 positions SH1	546	14	—N/a		Did not advance	

== Sitting volleyball ==
By finishing as runners-up in the European championship in Warendorf, Germany, Germany men's national sitting volleyball team qualified for the 2016 Summer Paralympics as Bosnia and Herzegovina men's national sitting volleyball team had already qualified for Rio.

=== Men ===
Pos	Team	Pld	W	L	Pts	SW	SL	SR	SPW	SPL	SPR	Qualification
1	Egypt	3	3	0	6	9	4	2.250	267	234	1.141	Semi-finals
2	Brazil (H)	3	2	1	5	8	4	2.000	278	212	1.311	Semi-finals
3	Germany	3	1	2	4	6	8	0.750	280	288	0.972	Classification 5th / 6th
4	United States	3	0	3	3	2	9	0.222	167	258	0.647	Classification 7th / 8th

Source: Paralympic.org
(H) Host

9 September 2016; 14:00	Egypt	3–2	Germany	Riocentro - Pavilion 6, Rio de Janeiro
9 September 2016; 14:00	(18–25, 21–25, 25–22, 25–14, 15–7); Report			Riocentro - Pavilion 6, Rio de Janeiro

11 September 2016; 18:30	United States	2–3	Germany	Riocentro - Pavilion 6, Rio de Janeiro
11 September 2016; 18:30	(25–20, 15–25, 10–25, 25–23, 10–15); Report			Riocentro - Pavilion 6, Rio de Janeiro

13 September 2016; 20:30	Germany	1–3	Brazil	Riocentro - Pavilion 6, Rio de Janeiro
13 September 2016; 20:30	(26–24, 23–25, 18–25, 12–25); Report			Riocentro - Pavilion 6, Rio de Janeiro

Classification 5th / 6th

16 September 2016; 15:30	Germany	1–3	Ukraine	Riocentro - Pavilion 6, Rio de Janeiro
16 September 2016; 15:30	(21–25, 25–22, 19–25, 23–25); Report			Riocentro - Pavilion 6, Rio de Janeiro

== Swimming ==
The top two finishers in each Rio medal event at the 2015 IPC Swimming World Championships earned a qualifying spot for their country for Rio. Daniela Schulte earned Germany a spot after winning silver in the Women's 100m Freestyle S11.

Men

Athlete	Event	Heats		Final	
Athlete	Event	Result	Rank	Result	Rank
Christoph Burkard	100m breaststroke SB6	1:29.90	6 Q	1:27.68	6
Tobias Pollap	50m freestyle S7	30.23	7 Q	30.04	8
Tobias Pollap	100m freestyle S7	1:05.73	5 Q	1:04.76	7
Tobias Pollap	50m butterfly S7	32.13	7 Q	32.91	8
Tobias Pollap	200m individual medley SM7	2:46.16	5 Q	2:45.40	6
Torben Schmidtke	100m freestyle S8	1:03.75	13	Did not advance	
Torben Schmidtke	400m freestyle S8	4:56.29	11	Did not advance	
Torben Schmidtke	100m breaststroke SB6	1:24.61	3 Q	1:23.47	3rd place, bronze medalist(s)
Hannes Schürmann	50m freestyle S7	32.93	12	Did not advance	
Hannes Schürmann	100m freestyle S7	1:10.09	11	Did not advance	
Hannes Schürmann	400m freestyle S7	5:26.39	11	Did not advance	
Hannes Schürmann	100m backstroke S7	1:22.39	10	Did not advance	
Hannes Schürmann	50m butterfly S7	36.39	13	Did not advance	
Hannes Schürmann	200m individual medley SM7	DSQ		Did not advance	
Daniel Simon	50m freestyle S12	25.23	9	Did not advance	
Daniel Simon	100m breaststroke SB12	1:11.52	7 Q	1:12.08	7

Women

Athlete	Event	Heats		Final	
Athlete	Event	Result	Rank	Result	Rank
Janina Breuer	200m freestyle S14	2:21.14	7 Q	2:22.16	8
Janina Breuer	100m backstroke S14	1:16.26	6 Q	1:16.02	6
Janina Breuer	100m breaststroke SB14	1:28.65	10	Did not advance	
Janina Breuer	200m individual medley SM14	2:41.69	9	Did not advance	
Annke Conradi	100m freestyle S3	2:28.57	10	Did not advance	
Annke Conradi	50m backstroke S3	1:12.28	11	Did not advance	
Denise Grahl	50m freestyle S7	33.28 ER	2 Q	33.16 ER	2nd place, silver medalist(s)
Denise Grahl	100m freestyle S7	1:13.43	2 Q	1:13.70	5
Denise Grahl	100m backstroke S7	1:28.08	8 Q	1:29.87	8
Denise Grahl	50m butterfly S7	40.62	9	Did not advance	
Elena Krawzow	50m freestyle S13	29.51	15	Did not advance	
Elena Krawzow	100m freestyle S13	1:06.89	19	Did not advance	
Elena Krawzow	100m breaststroke SB13	1:17.25	2 Q	1:17.46	5
Elena Krawzow	200m individual medley SM13	2:40.51	9	Did not advance	
Naomi Maike Schnittger	50m freestyle S12	28.87	2 Q	28.38	2nd place, silver medalist(s)
Naomi Maike Schnittger	100m freestyle S13	1:01.78	5 Q	1:01.57	6
Naomi Maike Schnittger	400m freestyle S13	4:43.59	3 Q	4:43.57	4
Naomi Maike Schnittger	100m butterfly S13	1:09.96	10	Did not advance	
Verena Schott	100m freestyle S7	1:18.57	8 Q	1:18.72	8
Verena Schott	400m freestyle S7	—N/a		5:41.47	5
Verena Schott	100m backstroke S7	1:28.12	9	Did not advance	
Verena Schott	100m breaststroke SB5	1:49.38	5 Q	1:46.07	4
Verena Schott	200 metre individual medley SM6	3:16.63	7 Q	3:10.44	4
Daniela Schulte	400m freestyle S11	5:27.41	3 Q	5:29.93	5
Daniela Schulte	100m backstroke S11	1:26.12	9	Did not advance	
Daniela Schulte	200m individual medley SM11	3:00.74	6 Q	2:59.08	7
Emely Telle	50m freestyle S12	31.19	8	30.87	8
Emely Telle	100m breaststroke SB13	1:21.78	9	Did not advance	
Emely Telle	100m butterfly S13	1:14.78	13	Did not advance	

== Table tennis ==
Men

Athlete	Event	Group Stage			Round 1	Quarterfinals	Semifinals	Final	
Athlete	Event	Opposition Result	Opposition Result	Rank	Opposition Result	Opposition Result	Opposition Result	Opposition Result	Rank
Holger Nikelis	Individual C1	Major (HUN); L 1–3	Joo Y-d (KOR); L 0–3	3	—N/a	Did not advance			
Thomas Brüchle	Individual C3	Abu Jame (JOR); W 3–1	Jeyoung Yi (KOR); W 3–1	1 Q	Kim J-s (KOR); W 3–1	Zhai X (CHN); W 3–2	Feng Pf (CHN); L 1–3	Merrien (FRA); L 2–3	4
Jan Gürtler	Individual C3	Zhao P (CHN); L 2–3	Yoshida (JPN); W 3–1	2 Q	Öhgren (SWE); W 3–0	Feng Pf (CHN); L 1–3	Did not advance		
Thomas Schmidberger	Individual C3	Makszin (ROU); W 3–0	Laowong (THA); W 3–0	1 Q	Abu Jame (JOR); W 3–0	Knaf (BRA); W 3–0	Merrien (FRA); W 3–2	Feng Pf (CHN); L 1–3	2nd place, silver medalist(s)
Valentin Baus	Individual C5	Segatto (BRA); W 3–0	Hunter-Spivey (GBR); W 3–0	1 Q	—N/a	Fetir (EGY); W 3–0	Palikuca (SRB); W 3–0	Cao Nn (CHN); L 0–3	2nd place, silver medalist(s)
Thomas Rau	Individual C6	Wetherill (GBR); W 3–0	Hamadtou (EGY); W 3–0	1 Q	—N/a	Park H-k (KOR); L 0–3	Did not advance		
Jochen Wollmert	Individual C7	Nikolenko (UKR); L 0–3	Messi (FRA); L 0–3	3	—N/a	Did not advance			
Thomas Brüchle; Thomas Schmidberger	Team C3	—N/a				Sweden; W 2–0	Brazil; W 2–0	China; L 1–2	2nd place, silver medalist(s)
Valentin Baus; Jan Gürtler	Team C4–5	—N/a			Serbia; W 2–0	South Korea; L 0–2	Did not advance		
Thomas Rau; Jochen Wollmert	Team C6–8	—N/a			Denmark; W 2–0	Ukraine; L 0–2	Did not advance		

Women

Athlete	Event	Group Stage				Quarterfinals	Semifinals	Final	
Athlete	Event	Opposition Result	Opposition Result	Opposition Result	Rank	Opposition Result	Opposition Result	Opposition Result	Rank
Sandra Mikolaschek	Individual C4	Matić (SRB); W 3–1	di Toro (AUS); W 3–0	—N/a	1 Q	Gilroy (GBR); L 2–3	Did not advance		
Stephanie Grebe	Individual C6	Lytovchenko (UKR); W 3–1	Marszal (POL); W 3–1	—N/a	1 Q	—N/a	Khodzynska (UKR); W 3–2	Paović (CRO); L 0–3	2nd place, silver medalist(s)
Juliane Wolf	Individual C8	Arloy (HUN); W 3–1	Kamkasomphou (FRA); L 0–3	Pan M (CHN); W 3–2	2 Q	—N/a	Mao Jd (CHN); L 1–3	Medina (PHI); L 0–3	4
Lena Kramm	Individual C9	Pek (POL); L 0–3	Rauen (BRA); L 0–3	Xiong G (CHN) 'L 0–3	4	—N/a	Did not advance		
Stephanie Grebe; Lena Kramm; Juliane Wolf	Team C6–10	—N/a				Brazil; L 0–2	Did not advance		

== Wheelchair basketball ==
=== Men ===
The Germany men's national wheelchair basketball team has qualified for the 2016 Rio Paralympics.

==== Group stage ====
Pos	Team	Pld	W	L	PF	PA	PD	Pts	Qualification
1	United States	5	5	0	402	206	+196	10	Quarter-finals
2	Great Britain	5	4	1	364	263	+101	9	Quarter-finals
3	Brazil (H)	5	2	3	309	314	−5	7 (Note: Head-to-head record: Brazil 3 pts, +11 PD; Germany 3 pts, +6 PD; Iran 3 pts, −17 PD)	Quarter-finals
4	Germany	5	2	3	337	314	+23	7	Quarter-finals
5	Iran	5	2	3	295	361	−66	7	9th/10th place playoff
6	Algeria	5	0	5	187	436	−249	5	11th/12th place playoff

Source: Paralympic.org
Rules for classification: 1) Points; 2) Head-to-head results; 3) Points difference; 4) Points scored.
(H) Hosts
Notes:

8 September 2016
18:00

Report

Germany	63–69	Iran
Scoring by quarter: 12–22, 14–14, 22–10, 15–23
Pts: Halouski 22; Rebs: Halouski 11		Pts: Ebrahimi 30; Rebs: Abedi 11; Asts: Ebrahimi 5

Carioca Arena 1, Rio de Janeiro
Referees: Sebastian Gauthier

9 September 2016
09:30

Report

United States	77–52	Germany
Scoring by quarter: 15–11, 24–15, 21–10, 17–15
Pts: Scott 15; Rebs: Serio 6 Asts: Paye, Serio 6		Pts: Bohme 26; Rebs: Halouski 8 Asts: Bienek 5

Rio Olympic Arena, Rio de Janeiro
Referees: Matt Wells

10 September 2016
18:00

Report

Germany	97–41	Algeria
Scoring by quarter: 22–14, 32–3, 33–16, 20–8
Pts: Bohme 29; Rebs: Bienek 8 Asts: Bienek 11		Pts: Guedoun 22; Rebs: Guedoun 8 Asts: Guedoun 6

Carioca Arena 1, Rio de Janeiro
Referees: Alexandre Lapointe

11 September 2016
12:15

Report

Great Britain	66–52	Germany
Scoring by quarter: 12–12, 19–12, 18–15, 17–13
Pts: Sagar 21; Rebs: Choudhry 7 Asts: Sagar, Choudhry 4		Pts: Passiwan 18; Rebs: Bohme 10; Asts: Passiwan 5

Carioca Arena 1, Rio de Janeiro
Referees: Toma Pajer

12 September 2016
21:45

Report

Brazil	61–73	Germany
Scoring by quarter: 8–15, 19–18, 18–21, 16–19
Pts: Da Silva 21; Rebs: De Miranda 12; Asts: Dos Santos 7		Pts: Bohme 26; Rebs: Bohme 13; Asts: Bohme 7

Rio Olympic Arena, Rio de Janeiro
Referees: Philip Haines

==== Quarterfinal ====
14 September 2016
11:45

Report

Spain	70–66	Germany
Scoring by quarter: 19–21, 15–19, 14–13, 22–13
Pts: A. Zarzuela, García 22; Rebs: A. Zarzuela 18; Asts: García 13		Pts: Halouski 21; Rebs: Halouski 15; Asts: Bienek 8

Rio Olympic Arena, Rio de Janeiro
Referees: Bill Kuerzi

=== Women ===
The Germany women's national wheelchair basketball team has qualified for the 2016 Rio Paralympics. As hosts, Brazil got to choose which group they were put into. They were partnered with Algeria, who would be put in the group they did not choose. Brazil chose Group A, which included Canada, Germany, Great Britain and Argentina. Algeria ended up in Group B with the United States, the Netherlands, France and China.

==== Group stage ====
Pos	Team	Pld	W	L	PF	PA	PD	Pts	Qualification
1	Germany	4	3	1	248	156	+92	7 (Note: Head-to-head record: Germany 3 pts, +9 PD; Great Britain 3 pts, −2 PD; Canada 3 pts, −7 PD)	Quarter-finals
2	Great Britain	4	3	1	228	140	+88	7	Quarter-finals
3	Canada	4	3	1	252	181	+71	7	Quarter-finals
4	Brazil (H)	4	1	3	196	241	−45	5	Quarter-finals
5	Argentina	4	0	4	87	296	−209	4	9th/10th place playoff

Source: Paralympic.org
Rules for classification: 1) Points; 2) Head-to-head results; 3) Points difference; 4) Points scored.
(H) Hosts
Notes:

9 September 2016
15:15

Report

Germany	77–32	Brazil
Scoring by quarter: 23–2, 22–11, 18–8, 14–11
Pts: Mohnen 21; Rebs: Mohnen, Miller 7 Asts: Mohnen, Zeyen 7		Pts: Almeida 7 Rebs: Almeida, Assuncao 4 Asts: Assuncao, Costa, Martins, Almeida 1

Rio Olympic Arena, Rio de Janeiro
Referees: Tomas Pajer

10 September 2016
11:45

Report

Great Britain	50–45	Germany
Scoring by quarter: 14–17, 10–7, 12–4, 14–17
Pts: Freeman, Conroy 14; Rebs: Freeman 9 Asts: Freeman 9		Pts: Mohnen 17; Rebs: Miller, Zeyen, Mohnen 6 Asts: Welin, Zeyen, Schunemann, Mohnen 3

Rio Olympic Arena, Rio de Janeiro
Referees: Juan Uruneula

11 September 2016
10:00

Report

Germany	68–54	Canada
Scoring by quarter: 20–14, 9–17, 16–11, 23–12
Pts: Mohnen 23; Rebs: Breuer 8 Asts: Mohnen 9		Pts: Cindy Ouellet 23; Rebs: Cindy Ouellet 6 Asts: McLachan, Harnock 5

Carioca Arena 1, Rio de Janeiro
Referees: Adam Froczak

12 September 2016
9:00

Report

Argentina	20–59	Germany
Scoring by quarter: 6–21, 2–11, 12–17, 0–10
Pts: Pallares 8 Rebs: Pallares 10; Asts: Pallares 2		Pts: Schunemann 20; Rebs: Schunemann 18; Asts: Schunemann, Gross 5

Carioca Arena 1, Rio de Janeiro
Referees: Celine Villard

==== Quarterfinal ====
13 September 2016
15:15

Report

Germany	76–28	France
Scoring by quarter: 14–5, 20–11, 16–3, 26–9
Pts: Miller 22; Rebs: Schunemann 14; Asts: Schunemann 14		Pts: Etavard-Glemp 8 Rebs: Menard 7 Asts: Etavard-Glemp 2

Rio Olympic Arena, Rio de Janeiro
Referees: Bill Kuerzi

==== Semifinal ====
15 September 2016
15:15

Report

Germany	55–45	Netherlands
Scoring by quarter: 14–4, 11–8, 7–15, 23–18
Pts: Miller 25; Rebs: Miller, Mohnen 12; Asts: Mohnen 7		Pts: Visser 10; Rebs: Beijer 13; Asts: Huitzing 4

Rio Olympic Arena, Rio de Janeiro
Referees: Juan Urunuela

==== Gold medal match ====
16 September 2016
17:30

Report

Germany	45–62	United States
Scoring by quarter: 12–14, 5–15, 12–20, 16–13
Pts: Schunemann 13; Rebs: Miller 9 Asts: Schunemann 6		Pts: Murray 33; Rebs: Hollermann 12; Asts: Hollermann 8

Rio Olympic Arena, Rio de Janeiro
Referees: Juan Urunuela

== Wheelchair fencing ==
Men

Athlete	Event	Group Stage					Quarterfinals	Semifinals	Final	
Athlete	Event	Opposition Result	Opposition Result	Opposition Result	Opposition Result	Rank	Opposition Result	Opposition Result	Opposition Result	Rank
Balwinder Cheema	Sabre B	Feng Y (CHN); L 2–5	Castro (POL); L 1–5	Mainville (CAN); L 0–5	Triantafyllou (GRE); L 4–5	5	Did not advance			

Women

Athlete	Event	Group Stage						Quarterfinals	Semifinals	Final	
Athlete	Event	Opposition Result	Opposition Result	Opposition Result	Opposition Result	Opposition Result	Rank	Opposition Result	Opposition Result	Opposition Result	Rank
Simone Briese-Bätke	Épée B	Demaude (FRA); W 5–4	Yao F (CHN); W 5–3	Pozniak (UKR); W 5–2	Makowska (POL); W 5–4	Loufaki (GRE); W 5–2	1 Q	Makrytskaya (BLR); W 15–9	Jana (THA); L 5–15	Chan Y C (HKG); L 14–15	4
Simone Briese-Bätke	Foil B	Chuen Y P (HKG); W 5–0	Vio (ITA); L 0–5	Yao F (CHN); L 3–5	Makrytskaya (BLR); L 3–5	Khetsuriani (GEO); L 2–5	5	Did not advance			

== Wheelchair tennis ==
Katharina Krüger qualified for Rio in the women's singles event.

Women

Athlete	Event	Round of 32	Round of 16	Quarterfinals	Semifinals	Final / BM	
Athlete	Event	Opposition Score	Opposition Score	Opposition Score	Opposition Score	Opposition Score	Rank
Katharina Krüger	Singles	Ochoa (ESP); W 6–1, 6–1	Huang H (CHN); L 0–6, 3–6	Did not advance			

== See also ==
- Germany at the 2016 Summer Olympics
