= Athletics at the 2020 Summer Paralympics – Men's 100 metres T64 =

Men's 100 metres T64 at the XVI Paralympic Games
- Venue: Tokyo National Stadium
- Dates: 29 August 2021 (heats); 30 August 2021 (final)
- Competitors: 15 from 9 nations
- Winning time: 10.76

Medalists
1st place, gold medalist(s)		Felix Streng	Germany
2nd place, silver medalist(s)		Sherman Guity	Costa Rica
3rd place, bronze medalist(s)		Johannes Floors	Germany
3rd place, bronze medalist(s)		Jonnie Peacock	Great Britain

Men's 100 metres
T11 · T12 · T13 · T33 · T34 · T35 · T36 · T37 · T38 · T47 · T51 · T52 · T53 · T54 · T63 · T64

The men's 100 metres T64 event at the 2020 Summer Paralympics in Tokyo, took place between 29 and 30 August 2021.

== Records ==
Prior to the competition, the existing records were as follows:

World Record	Richard Browne (USA)	10.61	Doha, Qatar	29 October 2015
Paralympic Record	Jonnie Peacock (GBR)	10.81	Rio de Janeiro, Brazil	8 September 2016

Area	Time	Athlete	Nation
Africa	10.93	Arnu Fourie	South Africa
America	10.61 WR	Richard Browne	United States
Asia	11.37	Kengo Oshima	Japan
Europe	10.64	Jonnie Peacock	Great Britain
Oceania	12.32	Mitchell Joynt	New Zealand

== Results ==
=== Heats ===
Heat 1 took place on 29 August 2021, at 21:23:

Rank	Lane	Name	Nationality	Class	Time	Notes
1	2	Johannes Floors	Germany	T62	10.79	Q, SB
2	7	Sherman Guity	Costa Rica	T64	10.88	Q, PB
3	4	Hunter Woodhall	United States	T62	11.17	Q
4	6	Jarryd Wallace	United States	T64	11.21	q
5	3	Kengo Oshima	Japan	T64	11.41	
6	8	Michail Seitis	Greece	T64	11.66	SB
7	5	Daniel du Plessis	South Africa	T62	11.72	

Heat 2 took place on 29 August 2021, at 21:29:

Rank	Lane	Name	Nationality	Class	Time	Notes
1	7	Felix Streng	Germany	T64	10.72	Q, GR
2	5	Jonnie Peacock	Great Britain	T64	10.87	Q, SB
3	6	Mpumelelo Mhlongo	South Africa	T44	11.06	Q, SB
4	2	Jonathan Gore	United States	T64	11.20	q
5	4	Olivier Hendriks	Netherlands	T62	11.29	
6	8	Alan Oliveira	Brazil	T62	11.30	
7	3	Tebogo Mofokeng	South Africa	T62	11.40	AR
8	9	David Behre	Germany	T62	12.10	

=== Final ===
The final took place on 30 August 2021, at 20:43:

Rank	Lane	Name	Nationality	Class	Time	Notes
1st place, gold medalist(s)	7	Felix Streng	Germany	T64	10.76	
2nd place, silver medalist(s)	6	Sherman Guity	Costa Rica	T64	10.78	PB
3rd place, bronze medalist(s)	5	Johannes Floors	Germany	T62	10.79	
3rd place, bronze medalist(s)	4	Jonnie Peacock	Great Britain	T64	10.79	SB
5	8	Mpumelelo Mhlongo	South Africa	T44	11.03	
6	2	Jarryd Wallace	United States	T64	11.04	
7	3	Jonathan Gore	United States	T64	11.08	
8	9	Hunter Woodhall	United States	T62	11.28	
