= Athletics at the 2016 Summer Paralympics – Men's 400 metres T44 =

Event at the 2016 Summer Paralympics

Men's 400 metres T44 at the XV Paralympic Games
- Venue: Estádio Olímpico João Havelange
- Dates: 14–15 September 2016
- Competitors: 12 from 9 nations
- Winning time: 46.20

Medalists
1st place, gold medalist(s)		Liam Malone	New Zealand
2nd place, silver medalist(s)		David Behre	Germany
3rd place, bronze medalist(s)		Hunter Woodhall	United States

The Athletics at the 2016 Summer Paralympics – Men's 400 metres T44 event at the 2016 Paralympic Games took place on 14–15 September 2016, at the Estádio Olímpico João Havelange.

The T44 category is for athletes who have a single below knee amputation or who can walk with moderately reduced function in one or both legs.

== Heats ==
=== Heat 1 ===
18:07 14 September 2016:

Rank	Lane	Bib	Name	Nationality	Reaction	Time	Notes
1	4	2386	Hunter Woodhall	United States		48.82	Q
2	2	2371	Nick Rogers	United States		49.45	Q
3	7	2154	Ajith Prasanna Kumar Hettiarachchi	Sri Lanka		55.89	Q
4	5	1902	Kyaw Kyaw Win	Myanmar		55.90	q
	6	1708	Emanuele di Marino	Italy			DSQ
	3	1540	Johannes Floors	Germany			DSQ

=== Heat 2 ===
18:14 14 September 2016:

Rank	Lane	Bib	Name	Nationality	Reaction	Time	Notes
1	7	1537	David Behre	Germany		47.74	Q
2	2	1960	Liam Malone	New Zealand		48.34	Q
3	6	2350	Aj Digby	United States		48.90	Q
4	4	1573	Michail Seitis	Greece		49.81	q
	5	1992	Jose Luis Casas	Peru			DSQ
	3	1154	Alan Fonteles Cardoso Oliveira	Brazil			DSQ

== Final ==
11:38 15 September 2016:

Rank	Lane	Bib	Name	Nationality	Reaction	Time	Notes
1st place, gold medalist(s)	4	1960	Liam Malone	New Zealand		46.20	
2nd place, silver medalist(s)	6	1537	David Behre	Germany		46.23	
3rd place, bronze medalist(s)	3	2386	Hunter Woodhall	United States		46.70	
4	8	2350	Aj Digby	United States		47.34	
5	5	2371	Nick Rogers	United States		48.90	
6	1	1573	Michail Seitis	Greece		49.66	
7	7	2154	Ajith Prasanna Kumar Hettiarachchi	Sri Lanka		56.50	
8	2	1902	Kyaw Kyaw Win	Myanmar		56.74	
