= Athletics at the 2016 Summer Paralympics – Men's 100 metres T44 =

Men's 100 metres T44 at the XV Paralympic Games
- Venue: Estádio Olímpico João Havelange
- Dates: 8–9 September 2016
- Competitors: 16 from 10 nations

Medalists
1st place, gold medalist(s)		Jonnie Peacock	Great Britain
2nd place, silver medalist(s)		Liam Malone	New Zealand
3rd place, bronze medalist(s)		Felix Streng	Germany

The T44 category is for athletes who have a single below knee amputation or who can walk with moderately reduced function in one or both legs.

The Athletics at the 2016 Summer Paralympics – Men's 100 metres T44 event at the 2016 Paralympic Games took place on 8–9 September 2016, at the Estádio Olímpico João Havelange.

== Heats ==
=== Heat 1 ===
17:45 8 September 2016:

Rank	Lane	Bib	Name	Nationality	Reaction	Time	Notes
1	2	1516	Jonnie Peacock	Great Britain		10.81	Q
2	3	2082	Arnu Fourie	South Africa		11.19	Q
3	5	1537	David Behre	Germany		11.23	Q
4	4	2376	Jerome Singleton	United States		11.23	q
5	6	2371	Nick Rogers	United States		11.26	q
6	8	1573	Michail Seitis	Greece		11.30	
7	7	1927	Ronald Hertog	Netherlands		11.46	
8	9	1153	Renato Nunes da Cruz	Brazil		11.79	

=== Heat 2 ===
17:52 8 September 2016:

Rank	Lane	Bib	Name	Nationality	Reaction	Time	Notes
1	4	1960	Liam Malone	New Zealand		10.90	Q
2	2	2382	Jarryd Wallace	United States		11.02	Q
3	3	1551	Felix Streng	Germany		11.12	Q
4	6	1154	Alan Fonteles Cardoso Oliveira	Brazil		11.26	
5	7	2086	Mpumelelo Mhlongo	South Africa		11.33	
6	5	1540	Johannes Floors	Germany		11.34	
7	8	1740	Keita Sato	Japan		11.77	
8	9	2154	Ajith Prasanna Kumar Hettiarachchi	Sri Lanka		12.11	

== Final ==
19:58 9 September 2016:

Rank	Lane	Bib	Name	Nationality	Reaction	Time	Notes
1st place, gold medalist(s)	4	1516	Jonnie Peacock	Great Britain		10.81	
2nd place, silver medalist(s)	6	1960	Liam Malone	New Zealand		11.02	
3rd place, bronze medalist(s)	8	1551	Felix Streng	Germany		11.03	
4	7	2082	Arnu Fourie	South Africa		11.11	
5	5	2382	Jarryd Wallace	United States		11.16	
6	3	2376	Jerome Singleton	United States		11.17	
7	9	1537	David Behre	Germany		11.26	
8	2	2371	Nick Rogers	United States		11.33	
