= Athletics at the 2016 Summer Paralympics – Men's 4 × 100 metres relay =

The Men's 4 x 100 metres relay athletics events for the 2016 Summer Paralympics took place at the Estádio Olímpico João Havelange between 12 and 15 September 2016. A total of two events was contested over this distance, with the T11-T13 event being open to three different disability classifications for visually impaired athletes and the T42-47 event open to six classifications for athletes with limb deficiencies.

== Schedule ==
R	Round 1	½	Semifinals	F	Final

Event↓/Date →	Thu 8	Fri 9	Sat 10	Sun 11	Mon 12	Tue 13	Wed 14	Thu 15	Fri 16	Sat 17
T11-13 4 × 100 m					R	F				
T42-47 4 × 100 m					F					

== Medal summary ==
Classification	Gold		Silver		Bronze	
T11-13	Brazil Jerônimo da Silva (T12); Gustavo Araújo (T13); Daniel Silva (T11) guide : Heitor de Oliveira Sales; Felipe Gomes (T11) guide : Jonas de Lima Silva	42.37 PR RR	China Di Dongdong (T11) guide : Wang Lin; Sun Qichao (T12); Chen Mingyu (T12); Liu Wei (T13)	43.05 RR	Uzbekistan Miran Sakhatov (T11) guide : Jaloliddin Khamrokulov; Mansur Abdirashidov (T12); Doniyor Saliev (T12); Fakhriddin Khamraev (T12)	43.47
T43-47	Germany Markus Rehm (T44); David Behre (T43); Felix Streng (T44); Johannes Floors (T43)	40.82 PR RR	Brazil Renato Nunes da Cruz (T44); Yohansson Nascimento (T46); Petrúcio Ferreira dos Santos (T47); Alan Fontelles (T43)	42.04 RR	Japan Hajimu Ashida (T47); Keita Sato (T44); Tomoki Tagawa (T47); Atsushi Yamamoto (T42)	44.16

== Results ==
=== T11-13 ===
The T11 category is for athletes with a visual impairment. A T11 athlete may be entirely without sight, or be able to perceive light, but have no ability to see the shape of a hand at any distance. T11 athletes commonly run with guides. The T12 category is for athletes with visual impairment. Athletes in this category will generally have some residual sight, the ability to recognise the shape of a hand at a distance of 2 metres and the ability to perceive clearly will be no more than 2/60. T12 athletes commonly run with guides. The T13 category is for athletes with a moderate visual impairment. Athletes in this category have a variety of visual impairments, but can typically recognize contours from a distance of 2 to 6 metres. Athletes in this category do not typically require a guide.

Rank	Lane	Nation	Competitors	Time	Notes
1st place, gold medalist(s)	3	Brazil	Diogo Ualisson Jerônimo da Silva (T12); Gustavo Henrique Araújo (T13); Daniel Silva (T11) guide : Heitor de Oliveira Sales; Felipe Gomes (T11) guide : Jonas de Lima Silva	42.37 PR RR	
2nd place, silver medalist(s)	5	China	Di Dongdong (T11) guide : Wang Lin; Sun Qichao (T12); Chen Mingyu (T12); Liu Wei (T13)	43.05 RR	
3rd place, bronze medalist(s)	1	Uzbekistan	Miran Sakhatov (T11) guide : Jaloliddin Khamrokulov; Mansur Abdirashidov (T12); Doniyor Saliev (T12); Fakhriddin Khamraev (T12)	43.47 SB	
4	7	Namibia	Johannes Nambala (T13); Moses Tobias (T11) guide : Andre Oberholster; Martin Amutenya Aloisius (T12); Ananias Shikongo (T11) guide : Even Tjiviju	43.66	

=== T42-47 ===
The T42 category is for single above-knee amputees and athletes with other impairments that are comparable to a single above knee amputation, including athletes with loss of muscle power in the lower limbs. The T44 category is for athletes who have a single below knee amputation or who can walk with moderately reduced function in one or both legs. The T46 category is for athletes who have a single above or below elbow amputation or similar disability, with normal function in both legs. The T47 category is for athletes who have a single below elbow or wrist amputation or similar disability, with normal function in both legs.

Rank	Lane	Nation	Competitors	Time	Notes
1st place, gold medalist(s)	6	Germany	Markus Rehm (T44); David Behre (T43); Felix Streng (T44); Johannes Floors (T43)	40.82 PR RR	
2nd place, silver medalist(s)	5	Brazil	Renato Nunes da Cruz (T44); Yohansson Nascimento (T46); Petrúcio Ferreira dos Santos (T47); Alan Fontelles (T43)	42.04 SB	
3rd place, bronze medalist(s)	3	Japan	Hajimu Ashida (T47); Keita Sato (T44); Tomoki Tagawa (T47); Atsushi Yamamoto (T42)	44.16 SB	
4	8	Sri Lanka	Upul Indika Abarana Gedara (T42); D. P. Herath Mudiyanselage (T46); Anil Prasanna Jayalath Yodha Pedige (T42); Ajith Prasanna Kumar Hettiarachchi (T44)	47.12	
5	4	Greece	Christos Koutoulias (T47); Michail Seitis (T44); Konstantin Veltsi (T44); Ioannis Sevdikalis (T43)	47.79	
-	7	United States	Jerome Singleton (T44); Jarryd Wallace (T44); Jaquvis Hart (T47); Hunter Woodhall (T43)	DSQ	
