= Felix Streng =

German Paralympic athlete

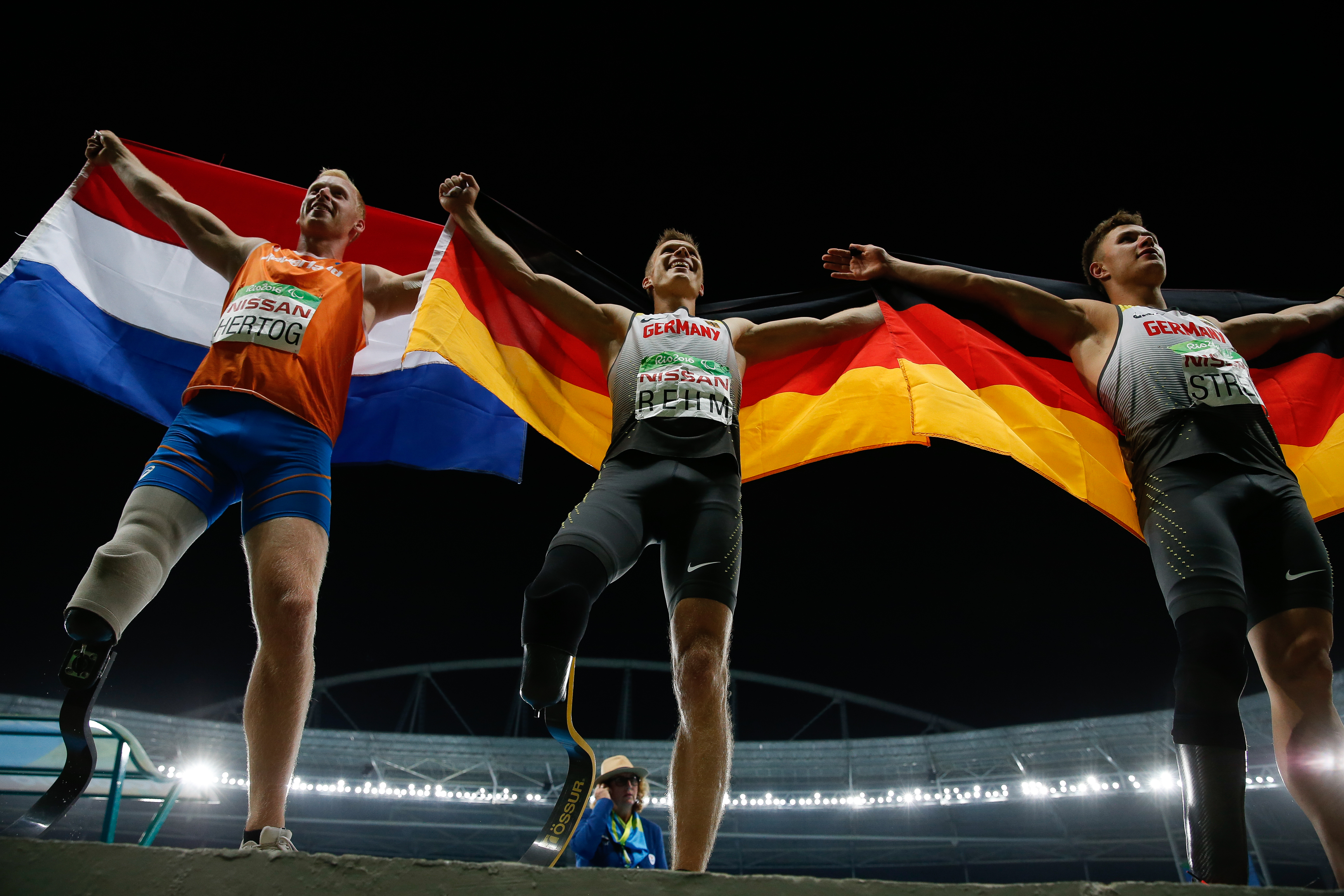
- Streng (right) at the 2016 Summer Paralympics

Personal information
- Born: 16 February 1995 (age 31) La Paz, Bolivia

Sport
- Sport: Athletics
- Disability class: T44
- Events: Long jump, sprint
- Club: Bayer Leverkusen AC

Achievements and titles
- Paralympic finals: 2016, 2020, 2024
Medal record
Representing Germany
Paralympic Games
Gold medal – first place	2016 Rio	4×100 m T42-47
Gold medal – first place	2020 Tokyo	100 m T64
Silver medal – second place	2020 Tokyo	200 m T64
Bronze medal – third place	2016 Rio	100 m T44
Bronze medal – third place	2016 Rio	Long jump T44
Bronze medal – third place	2024 Paris	100 m T64
World Championships
Gold medal – first place	2015 Doha	4×100 m T42-47
Gold medal – first place	2025 New Delhi	100 m T64
Gold medal – first place	2025 New Delhi	200 m T64
Bronze medal – third place	2023 Paris	100 m T64
European Championships
Gold medal – first place	2014 Swansea	200 m T44
Gold medal – first place	2016 Grosseto	4×100 m T42-47
Gold medal – first place	2018 Berlin	100 m T64
Gold medal – first place	2018 Berlin	200 m T64
Gold medal – first place	2018 Berlin	4×100 m T42-47/61-64
Silver medal – second place	2014 Swansea	100 m T44
Silver medal – second place	2016 Grosseto	Long jump T44
Silver medal – second place	2016 Grosseto	100 m T44
Silver medal – second place	2016 Grosseto	200 m T44

Felix Streng (born 16 February 1995) is a German Paralympic track and field athlete. A single leg amputee, Streng competes in both sprint and long jump events, competing in the T44 classification. He has won medals at both European and World Championship level and was part of the German men's 4 × 100 metres relay team that won gold at the 2016 Summer Paralympics in Rio.

== Personal life ==
Streng was born in La Paz, Bolivia in 1995. He was born without his right foot and part of his lower shin. In 2001 his family moved to Coburg in Germany.

== Athletics career ==
In 2012 Streng visited Bayer Leverkusen Athletics Club as part of a school project investigating parasport. While there he was invited to join and he accepted the offer. Classified as a T44 athlete, Streng broke into the German national team and in 2014 he represented his country at the 2014 IPC Athletics European Championships in Swansea. There he competed in four events, finishing fourth in the long jump, and in his favoured sprinting events he won silver in the men's 100 metres and a gold in the 200 metres, making him European champion. The next year, at the 2015 IPC Athletics World Championships in Doha, Streng was part of Germany's 4×100 metre (T42-47) team that took gold with a European record of 41.86 seconds. Streng also entered the 100 and 200 metre sprints and the long jump, but failed to finish in the medal winning positions.

Two years later in the buildup to the 2016 Summer Paralympics in Rio, Streng entered his second European Championships, this time held in Grosseto in Italy. He won three silvers, in the 100 metres, 200 metres and the long jump. In the 100 meters he was beaten to second place by two hundredths of a second by Britain's Jonnie Peacock, while in the other two events he finished behind his own teammates, Markus Rehm in the long jump and Johannes Floors in the 200 metres, despite running a European record time in the T44 class in the latter. Streng finished the Grosseto games with a gold in the men's 4×100 metres (T42-47) alongside the same teammates who took gold in Doha the year prior, Floors, Rhem and Behre. The German team beat their previous European record with an improved time of 41.49 seconds, ahead of Russia and Italy.

At the 2016 Summer Paralympics, Streng entered four events. In the 100 metres (T44) despite, by his own evaluation, a weak qualification round (in which Streng finished third in his heat to qualify for the final) he posted a time of 11.03 seconds in the final to take the bronze medal behind Peacock and New Zealand newcomer Liam Malone. Streng and his coach were delighted with the result due to the strength of the competition. In the 200 metres (T44), Streng qualified for the final as one of the fastest losers but was disqualified for a false start in the finals. Streng had better fortune in the T44 long jump, hitting a personal best distance of 7.13 metres to claim a second bronze medal of the Games. He completed his time in Rio with a gold medal, as he again teamed up with Floors, Rhem and Behre to win the 4 × 100 metres relay. The team improved their time again, posting 40.82 seconds to not only beat their own European record but also set a new Paralympic record. For their success in the relay the four sprinters were named team of the year by the German National Paralympic Committee.
