= 2018 World Para Athletics European Championships – Men's 4 × 100 metres relay =

The men's 4 × 100 metres relay at the 2018 World Para Athletics European Championships was held at the Friedrich-Ludwig-Jahn-Sportpark in Berlin from 20 to 26 August. 1 event will be held over this distance.

== Medalists ==
Event	Gold		Silver		Bronze
T42-47/61-64	Germany; Phil Grolla (T47); Felix Streng (T64); Markus Rehm (T64); Johannes Floors (T62)	41.42 CR	Italy; Emanuele di Marino (T44); Simone Manigrasso (T64); Riccardo Bagaini (T47); Andrea Lanfri (T62)	44.17	no medal awarded
WR world record | AR area record | CR championship record | GR games record | NR national record | OR Olympic record | PB personal best | SB season best | WL world leading (in a given season)

== See also ==
- List of IPC world records in athletics
