= Naomi Maike Schnittger =

German Paralympic swimmer (born 1994)

Personal information
- Born: 6 April 1994 (age 32) Yokohama, Japan

Sport
- Country: Germany
- Sport: Para swimming
- Disability class: S12
Medal record
Women's para swimming
Representing Germany
Paralympic Games
Silver medal – second place	2016 Rio de Janeiro	50 m freestyle S12
World Championships
Bronze medal – third place	2010 Eindhoven	400 m freestyle S12
Bronze medal – third place	2013 Montreal	100 m freestyle S12
Bronze medal – third place	2015 Glasgow	50 m freestyle S12
European Championships
Gold medal – first place	2018 Dublin	400 m freestyle S12
Bronze medal – third place	2014 Eindhoven	400 m freestyle S12
Bronze medal – third place	2016 Funchal	50 m freestyle S12

Naomi Maike Schnittger (born 6 April 1994) is a German Paralympic swimmer.

== Career ==
She represented Germany at the 2012 Summer Paralympics and at the 2016 Summer Paralympics and she won the silver medal in the women's 50 metre freestyle S12 event in 2016.
