= Cycling at the 2016 Summer Paralympics – Women's road time trial H4–5 =

Cycling, Women's road time trial H4-5 at the XV Paralympic Games
- Venue: Flamengo Park
- Dates: 14 September
- Competitors: 11 from 8 nations

Medalists
1st place, gold medalist(s)		Dorothee Vieth	Germany
2nd place, silver medalist(s)		Andrea Eskau	Germany
3rd place, bronze medalist(s)		Laura de Vaan	Netherlands

The Women's time trial H4-5 road cycling event at the 2016 Summer Paralympics took place on 14 September at Flamengo Park, Pontal. eleven riders competed.

The H4 category and H5 category are for cyclists using handcycles because of lower limb dysfunction or amputation.

== Results : Women's road time trial H4-5 ==
Rank	Name	Nationality	Time	Deficit	Avg. Speed km/h
1st place, gold medalist(s)	Dorothee Vieth	Germany	31:35.46	0	37.986
2nd place, silver medalist(s)	Andrea Eskau	Germany	32:15.42	+0:39.96	37.201
3rd place, bronze medalist(s)	Laura de Vaan	Netherlands	33:02.92	+1:27.46	36.310
4	Lee Do-yeon	South Korea	33:14.25	+1:38.79	36.104
5	Oksana Masters	United States	33:49.70	+2:14.24	35.473
6	Christiane Reppe	Germany	33:54.53	+2:19.07	35.389
7	Jennette Jansen	Netherlands	34:07.92	+2:32.46	35.158
8	Sandra Graf	Switzerland	34:30.00	+2:54.54	34.783
9	Jessica Enfot	Sweden	36:48.63	+5:13.17	32.599
10	Sandra Stoekli	Switzerland	38:02.41	+6:26.95	31.546
