= Swimming at the 2016 Summer Paralympics – Women's 50 metre freestyle S12 =

Women's 50 metre freestyle S12 at the XV Paralympic Games
- Venue: Olympic Aquatics Stadium
- Dates: 17 September 2016
- Competitors: 10 from 7 nations

Medalists
1st place, gold medalist(s)		Hannah Russell	Great Britain
2nd place, silver medalist(s)		Naomi Maike Schnittger	Germany
3rd place, bronze medalist(s)		María Delgado	Spain

The women's 50 metre freestyle S12 event at the 2016 Paralympic Games took place on 17 September 2016, at the Olympic Aquatics Stadium. Two heats were held. The swimmers with the eight fastest times advanced to the final.

== Heats ==
=== Heat 1 ===
10:22 17 September 2016:

Rank	Lane	Name	Nationality	Time	Notes
1	4	Naomi Maike Schnittger	Germany	28.87	Q
2	5	Maryna Stabrovska	Ukraine	29.90	Q
3	6	Yaryna Matlo	Ukraine	30.16	Q
4	3	Anabel Moro	Argentina	30.49	Q
5	2	Ana Luz Pellitero	Argentina	32.23	

=== Heat 2 ===
10:25 17 September 2016:

Rank	Lane	Name	Nationality	Time	Notes
1	4	Hannah Russell	Great Britain	27.79	Q
2	5	María Delgado	Spain	29.45	Q
3	3	Belkis Mota	Venezuela	30.50	Q
4	6	Emely Telle	Germany	31.19	Q
5	2	Raquel Viel	Brazil	31.87	

== Final ==
18:06 17 September 2016:

Rank	Lane	Name	Nationality	Time	Notes
1st place, gold medalist(s)	4	Hannah Russell	Great Britain	27.53	
2nd place, silver medalist(s)	5	Naomi Maike Schnittger	Germany	28.38	
3rd place, bronze medalist(s)	3	María Delgado	Spain	29.03	
4	7	Anabel Moro	Argentina	30.01	
5	6	Maryna Stabrovska	Ukraine	30.02	
6	1	Belkis Mota	Venezuela	30.47	
7	2	Yaryna Matlo	Ukraine	30.65	
8	8	Emely Telle	Germany	30.87	
