= Swimming at the 2016 Summer Paralympics – Women's 100 metre freestyle S7 =

Women's 100 metre freestyle S7 at the XV Paralympic Games
- Venue: Olympic Aquatics Stadium
- Dates: 16 September 2016
- Competitors: 11 from 8 nations

Medalists
1st place, gold medalist(s)		McKenzie Coan	United States
2nd place, silver medalist(s)		Cortney Jordan	United States
3rd place, bronze medalist(s)		Yajing Huang	China

The women's 100 metre freestyle S7 event at the 2016 Paralympic Games took place on 16 September 2016, at the Olympic Aquatics Stadium. Two heats were held. The swimmers with the eight fastest times advanced to the final.

== Heats ==
=== Heat 1 ===
9:37 16 September 2016:

Rank	Lane	Name	Nationality	Time	Notes
1	3	Denise Grahl	Germany	1:13.43	Q
2	5	Yajing Huang	China	1:13.50	Q
3	4	Cortney Jordan	United States	1:14.13	Q
4	6	Rebecca Dubber	New Zealand	1:18.85	
5	2	Erel Halevi	Israel	1:21.56	

=== Heat 2 ===
9:40 16 September 2016:

Rank	Lane	Name	Nationality	Time	Notes
1	4	McKenzie Coan	United States	1:09.74	Q
2	5	Susannah Rodgers	Great Britain	1:13.96	Q
3	6	Liting Ke	China	1:15.15	Q
4	3	Tess Routliffe	Canada	1:15.70	Q
5	2	Verena Schott	Germany	1:18.57	Q
6	7	Brenda Tilk	Estonia	1:23.85	

== Final ==
17:36 16 September 2016:

Rank	Lane	Name	Nationality	Time	Notes
1st place, gold medalist(s)	4	McKenzie Coan	United States	1:09.99	
2nd place, silver medalist(s)	2	Cortney Jordan	United States	1:12.80	
3rd place, bronze medalist(s)	3	Yajing Huang	China	1:12.85	
4	6	Susannah Rodgers	Great Britain	1:12.92	
5	5	Denise Grahl	Germany	1:13.70	
6	1	Tess Routliffe	Canada	1:13.97	
7	7	Liting Ke	China	1:16.26	
8	8	Verena Schott	Germany	1:18.72	
