= Laura de Vaan =

Dutch Paralympic cyclist

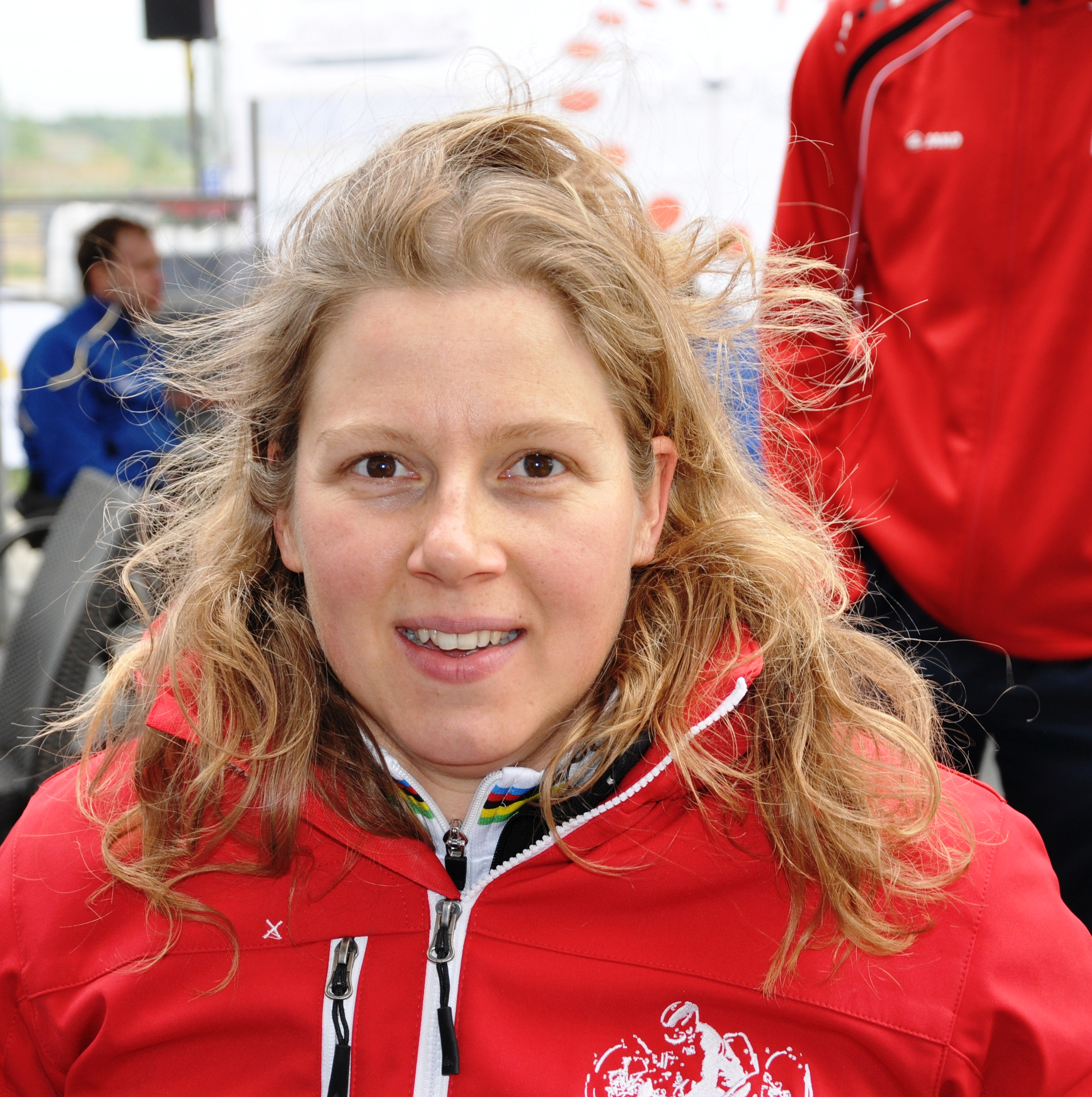
- de Vaan (2016)

Personal information
- Born: 11 August 1980 (age 45) Uden, Netherlands

Sport
- Country: Netherlands
Medal record
Women's cycling
Representing Netherlands
Paralympic Games
| Silver medal – second place | 2012 London | Road race H4 |
| Silver medal – second place | 2016 Rio de Janeiro | Road race H5 |
| Bronze medal – third place | 2012 London | Road time trial H4 |
| Bronze medal – third place | 2016 Rio de Janeiro | Road time trial H4–5 |

Laura de Vaan (born 11 August 1980 in Uden) is a Dutch Paralympian who competes in handcycle events. de Vaan has appeared in two Summer Paralympics, 1998 in Beijing and 2012 in London. In the London Games she won silver in the H4 women's road race and Bronze in the H4 time trial.

== Personal history ==
De Vaan was born in Uden in 1980. She was educated at Heythuysen High School and in 1998 matriculated to Nijmegen University where she studied Dutch Language and Literature. In 1996, she was left requiring a wheelchair after missing the last step of a flight of stairs. It was only after her accident that she was diagnosed with complex regional pain syndrome and although she has some mobility in her legs.

== Cycling career ==
De Vaan took to Handbiking in 2004, and in 2005 entered her first competitive race in the Open European Championship where she took bronze in both the Road Race and the Time Trial. Her results at the 2007 World Championships saw her qualify for the 2008 Summer Paralympics in Beijing. There she competed in both the Women's Individual Road Race and the Cycling Road Women's Individual Time Trial. She came fifth in the Road Race and seventh in the Time Trial. De Vaan stated that the experience of competing in Beijing increased her desire to focus on the sport and she set herself a goal of winning medals at the London Paralympic Games in 2012. After finishing in the top three without a victory, de Vaan won the H3 Road Race at the Road World Championships in September 2011.

In the 2012 Summer Paralympic Games de Vaan took medals in both the Time Trial and Road Race. She won the bronze in the Time Trial and a photo finish in the Road Race gave her silver over long time rival Dorothee Vieth of Germany.
