= Swimming at the 2016 Summer Paralympics – Men's 100 metre breaststroke SB6 =

Men's 100 metre breaststroke SB6 at the XV Paralympic Games
- Venue: Olympic Aquatics Stadium
- Dates: 15 September 2016
- Competitors: 11 from 10 nations

Medalists
1st place, gold medalist(s)		Ievgenii Bogodaiko	Ukraine
2nd place, silver medalist(s)		Nelson Crispín	Colombia
3rd place, bronze medalist(s)		Torben Schmidtke	Germany

The Men's 100 metre breaststroke SB6 event at the 2016 Paralympic Games took place on 15 September 2016, at the Olympic Aquatics Stadium. Two heats were held. The swimmers with the eight fastest times advanced to the final.

== Heats ==
=== Heat 1 ===
9:47 15 September 2016:

Rank	Lane	Name	Nationality	Time	Notes
1	4	Torben Schmidtke	Germany	1:24.61	Q
2	5	Andreas Skaar Bjornstad	Norway	1:28.78	Q
3	3	Thijs van Hofweegen	Netherlands	1:31.12	Q
4	6	Maarten Libin	Belgium	1:31.22	
5	2	Yoav Valinsky	Israel	1:34.36	

=== Heat 2 ===
9:51 15 September 2016:

Rank	Lane	Name	Nationality	Time	Notes
1	5	Nelson Crispín	Colombia	1:22.74	Q
2	4	Ievgenii Bogodaiko	Ukraine	1:22.88	Q
3	3	Yingbin Di	China	1:29.70	Q
4	2	Christoph Burkard	Germany	1:29.90	Q
5	6	Antoni Ponce Bertran	Spain	1:30.49	Q
6	7	Panagiotis Christakis	Greece	1:37.98	

== Final ==
17:43 15 September 2016:

Rank	Lane	Name	Nationality	Time	Notes
1st place, gold medalist(s)	5	Ievgenii Bogodaiko	Ukraine	1:18.71	WR
2nd place, silver medalist(s)	4	Nelson Crispín	Colombia	1:21.47	
3rd place, bronze medalist(s)	3	Torben Schmidtke	Germany	1:23.47	
4	6	Andreas Skaar Bjornstad	Norway	1:26.07	
5	2	Yingbin Di	China	1:27.43	
6	7	Christoph Burkard	Germany	1:27.68	
7	1	Antoni Ponce Bertran	Spain	1:30.33	
8	8	Thijs van Hofweegen	Netherlands	1:32.36	
