= 2016 IPC Athletics European Championships – Men's 4 × 100 metres relay =

The men's 4 × 100 metres relay at the 2016 IPC Athletics European Championships were held at the Stadio Olimpico Carlo Zecchini in Grosseto from 11 to 16 June.

== Medalists ==
Event	Gold		Silver		Bronze	
T11-T13	Fedor Trikolich (T12); Aleksei Labzin (T13); Artem Loginov (T12); Andrei Koptev (T11); Sergey Petrichenko Guide; Russia	42.74 CR	Rodolfo Alves (T13); Firmino Baptista (T11); Joao Barros Guide; Luis Goncalves (T12); Gabriel Potra (T12); Portugal	44.97	—N/a	
T42-T47	Markus Rehm (T44); David Behre (T43); Felix Streng (T44); Johannes Floors (T43); Germany	41.49 ER	Anton Prokhorov (T42); Aleksei Kotlov (T47); Vadim Trunov (T47); Petr Mikhalkov (T44); Russia	44.03 NR	Roberto La Barbera (T44); Ismail Sadfi (T46); Emanuele di Marino (T44); Andrea Lanfri (T43); Italy	46.23 NR
WR world record | AR area record | CR championship record | GR games record | NR national record | OR Olympic record | PB personal best | SB season best | WL world leading (in a given season)

== See also ==
- List of IPC world records in athletics
