= Emely Telle =

German Paralympic swimmer (born 1997)

Personal information
- Born: 9 January 1997 (age 29) Weimar, Germany

Sport
- Country: Germany
- Sport: Paralympic swimming
- Disability class: S12, SB12
Medal record
Paralympic swimming
Representing Germany
World Championships
Silver medal – second place	2013 Montreal	100m breaststroke SB12
Silver medal – second place	2015 Glasgow	100m breaststroke SB12
European Championships
Silver medal – second place	2014 Eindhoven	100m breaststroke SB12

Emely Telle (born 9 January 1997) is a German former Paralympic swimmer who competed at international swimming competitions. She is a two-time World silver medalist and European silver medalist in the breaststroke. She also competed at the 2016 Summer Paralympics where she finished in eighth and ninth place in the 50m freestyle S12 and 100m breaststroke SB13 respectively.
