= Cycling at the 2016 Summer Paralympics – Women's road race H5 =

Cycling, Women's road race H5 at the XV Paralympic Games
- Venue: Pontal, Rio
- Dates: September 15
- Competitors: 6

The women's road race H5 cycling event at the 2016 Summer Paralympics took place on September 15 at Pontal, Rio. The race distance was 45 km (28.0 mi), in three laps of 15 km (9.3 mi) each.

== Results : Women's road race H5 ==
Rank	Name	Nationality	Classification	Final Time	Time Behind
1st place, gold medalist(s)	Andrea Eskau	Germany	H5	1:37:07	+0
2nd place, silver medalist(s)	Laura de Vaan	Netherlands	H5	1:37:09	+2
3rd place, bronze medalist(s)	Jennette Jansen	Netherlands	H5	"	"
4	Oksana Masters	United States	H5	"	"
5	Dorothee Vieth	Germany	H5	1:37:15	+8
6	Jessica Enfot	Sweden	H5	1:37:22	+15
