= Fedor Trikolich =

Russian Paralympic sprinter

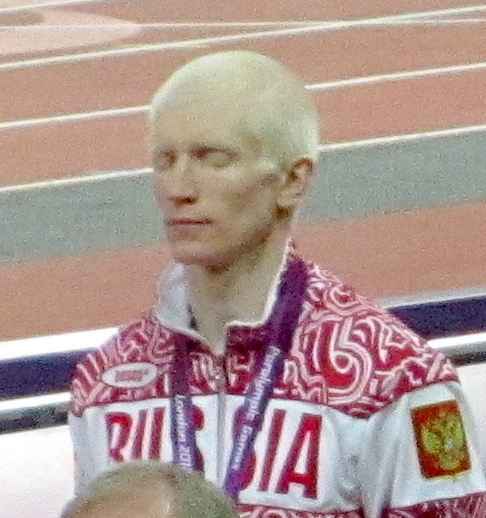
- Trikolich at the 2012 Paralympics

Personal information
- Nationality: Russian
- Born: 2 March 1984 (age 42) Leningrad, Russia
- Height: 180 cm (5 ft 11 in)

Sport
- Country: Russia
- Sport: Paralympic athletics
- Disability class: T12
- Club: St. Petersburg Athletics Academy
- Coached by: Andrey Eremenko
Medal record
Men's para-athletics
Representing Russia
Paralympic Games
Gold medal – first place	2012 London	100 m T12
Gold medal – first place	2012 London	100m relay T11–13
Silver medal – second place	2012 London	200 m T12
IPC World Championships
Gold medal – first place	2011 Christchurch	100 m relay T11–13
Gold medal – first place	2013 Lyon	100 m relay T11–13
Silver medal – second place	2013 Lyon	200 m T12
Gold medal – first place	2015 Doha	100 m T11–13
Bronze medal – third place	2015 Doha	100 m T12
Bronze medal – third place	2015 Doha	200 m T12
IPC European Championships
Gold medal – first place	2014 Swansea	100 m relay T11–13
Gold medal – first place	2016 Grosseto	100 m relay T11–13
Silver medal – second place	2012 Stadskanaal	100m T12
Silver medal – second place	2012 Stadskanaal	200m T12
Silver medal – second place	2016 Grosseto	100 m T12

Fedor Viktorovich Trikolich (Фёдор Викторович Триколич; born 2 March 1985) is a visually impaired Russian sprinter. He competed at the 2008 and 2012 Paralympics and won two gold and a silver medal in 2012. He is also a multiple world and European champion, taking nine medals over five tournaments.
