= Athletics at the 2016 Summer Paralympics – Women's 100 metres T38 =

Women's 100 metres T38 at the XV Paralympic Games
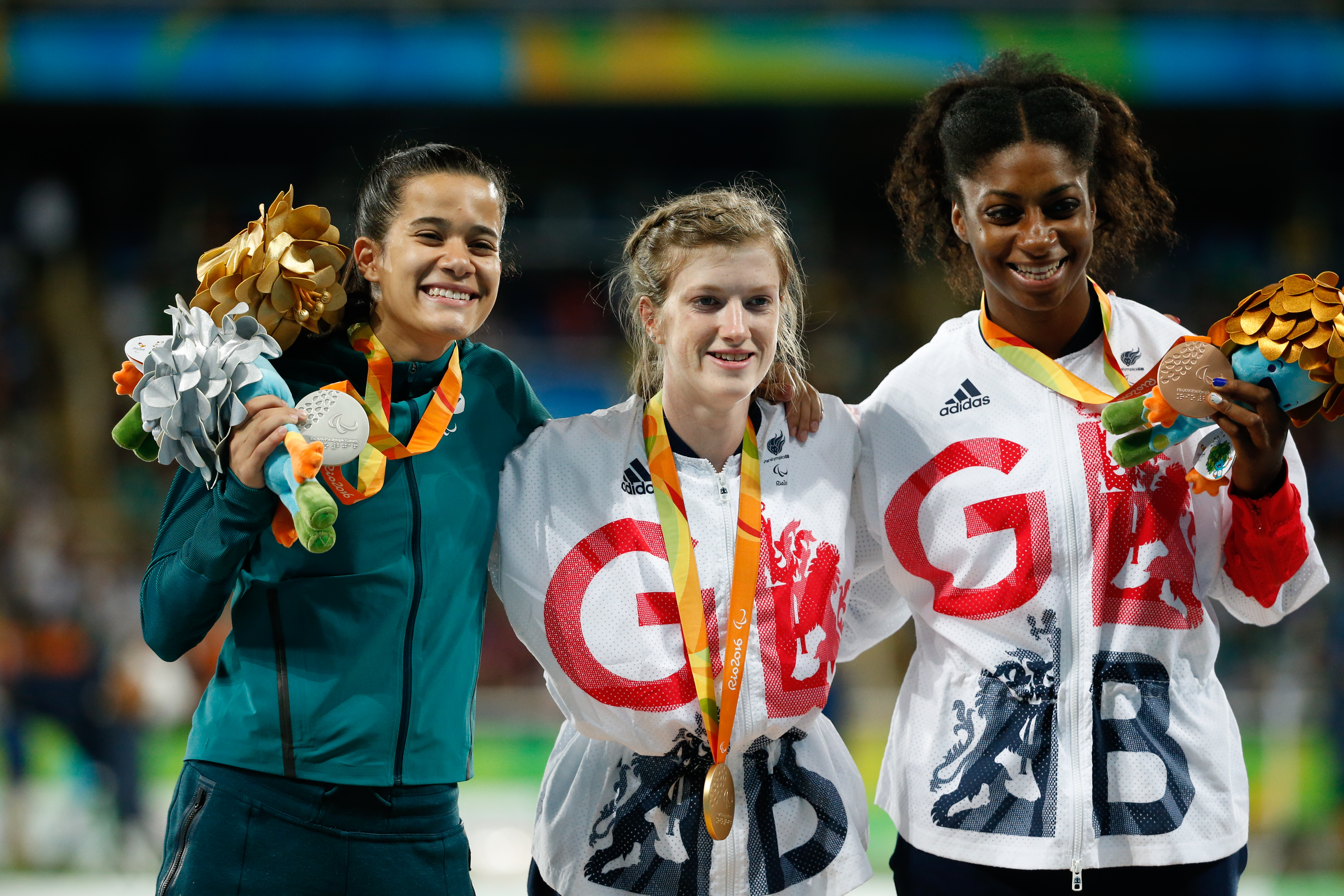
- Left-right: Hipólito, Hahn, Cox
- Venue: Estádio Olímpico Nilton Santos
- Dates: 8 and 9 September
- Competitors: 14

Medalists
1st place, gold medalist(s)		Sophie Hahn	Great Britain
2nd place, silver medalist(s)		Verônica Hipólito	Brazil
3rd place, bronze medalist(s)		Kadeena Cox	Great Britain

The Women's 100 metres T38 event at the 2016 Summer Paralympics took place at the Estádio Olímpico Nilton Santos on 8 and 9 September. It featured 16 athletes from 11 countries.

The event is for athletes with the lowest level of disability in the cerebral palsy class.

== Heats ==
In the heats, the first three in each race, and the 2 fastest losers overall qualify for the final.

=== Heat 1 ===
Rank	Athlete	Country	Time	Notes
1	Veronica Hipolito	Brazil	12.84	Q, PR
2	Lindy Ave	Germany	13.28	Q
3	Ella Pardy	Australia	13.30	Q
4	Olivia Breen	Great Britain	13.35	q
5	Sonia Mansour	Tunisia	14.30	
6	Yuka Takamatsu	Japan	14.33	
7	Maria Fernandes	Portugal	14.65	

=== Heat 2 ===
Rank	Athlete	Country	Time	Notes
1	Sophie Hahn	Great Britain	12.62	Q, PR
2	Kadeena Cox	Great Britain	12.98	Q
3	Chen Junfei	China	13.03	Q
4	Jennifer Santos	Brazil	13.62	q
5	Anna Trener-Wierciak	Poland	13.70	
6	Nicole Nicoleitzik	Germany	14.49	
7	Vanessa Braun	Germany	14.59	

== Final ==
Rank	Athlete	Country	Time	Notes
1st place, gold medalist(s)	Sophie Hahn	Great Britain	12.62	=PR
2nd place, silver medalist(s)	Veronica Hipolito	Brazil	12.88	
3rd place, bronze medalist(s)	Kadeena Cox	Great Britain	13.01	
4	Chen Junfei	China	13.06	
5	Lindy Ave	Germany	13.20	
6	Ella Pardy	Australia	13.22	
7	Olivia Breen	Great Britain	13.41	
8	Jennifer Santos	Brazil	13.61	
			Wind:	
