= Jonnie Peacock =

British athlete (born 1993)

Jonnie Peacock MBE
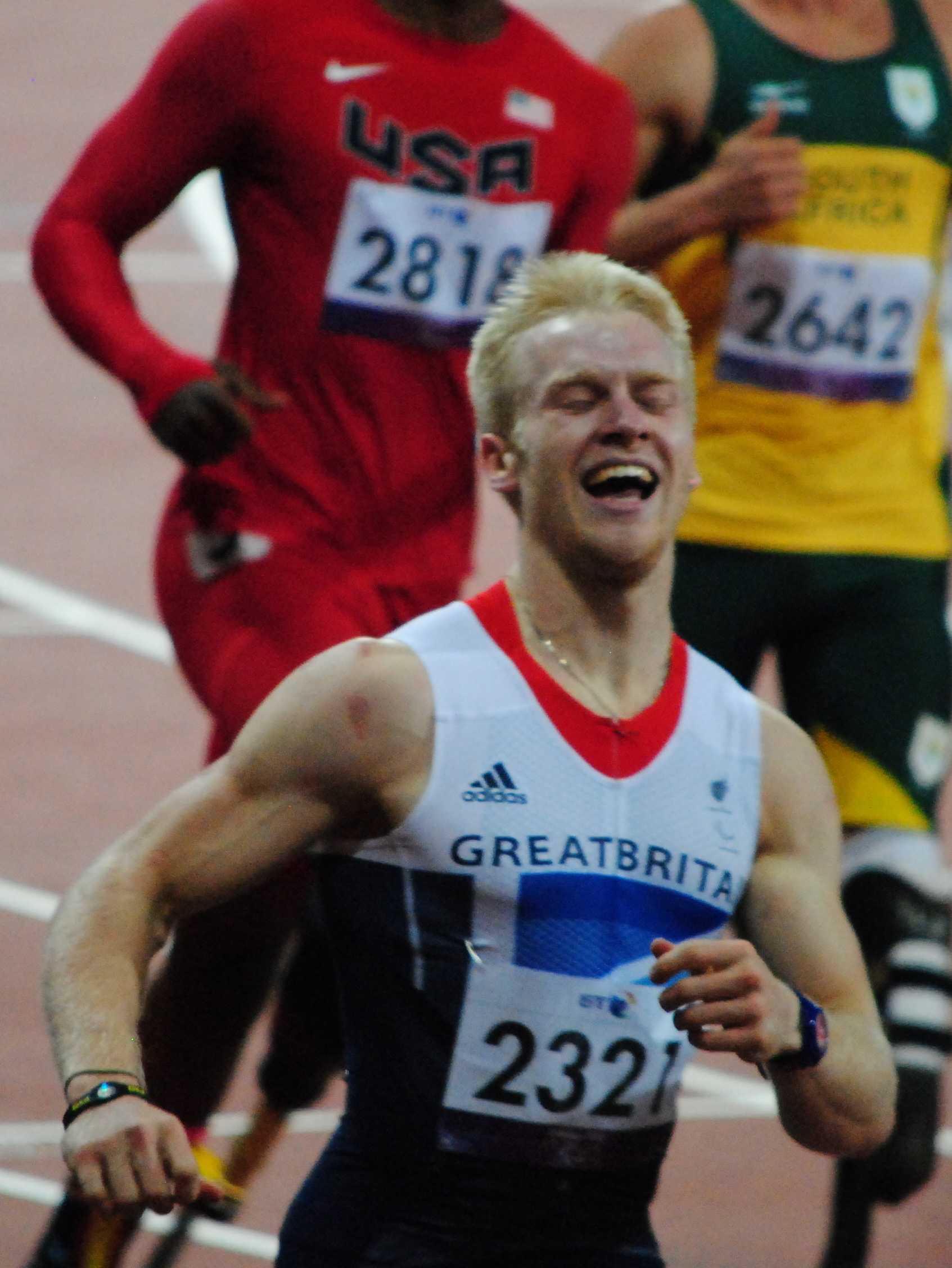
- Peacock at the 2012 London Paralympics

Personal information
- Born: Jonathan Peacock; 28 May 1993 (age 33) Cambridge, Cambridgeshire, England
- Height: 5 ft 10 in (1.78 m)

Sport
- Country: Great Britain
- Sport: Running
- Event: Sprints (100m)
Medal record
Men's para athletics
Representing Great Britain
Paralympic Games
Gold medal – first place	2012 London	100m T44
Gold medal – first place	2016 Rio	100m T44
Silver medal – second place	2020 Tokyo	mixed 4×100 m relay
Silver medal – second place	2024 Paris	mixed 4×100 m relay
Bronze medal – third place	2020 Tokyo	100m T64
World Championships
Gold medal – first place	2013 Lyon	100 m T44
Gold medal – first place	2017 London	100 m T44
European Championships
Gold medal – first place	2014 Swansea	100m – T44
Gold medal – first place	2016 Grosseto	100m – T44
- Updated on 28 February 2018

Jonathan Peacock (born 28 May 1993) is an English sprint runner. An amputee, Peacock won gold at the 2012 Summer Paralympics and 2016 Summer Paralympics, representing Great Britain in the T44 men's 100 metres event. He won a bronze medal at the 2020 Summer Paralympics.

== Biography ==
Peacock was born in Cambridge, and grew up in the village of Shepreth. At age 5, he contracted meningitis, resulting in the disease killing the tissues in his right leg, which was then amputated just below the knee. Wanting to play football, he was directed to a Paralympic sports talent day when he asked about disability sport in the hospital that fitted his prosthetic leg. His mother would carry him to school when his very short stump was too sore to wear his prosthetic leg. Peacock refers to his stump as his "sausage leg." As a teenager, Peacock lived in St Ives, Cambridgeshire and attended St Ivo School.

Peacock ran his first international race at the Paralympic World Cup in Manchester in May 2012. In June 2012 Peacock set a new 100 metres world record in amputee sprinting at the United States Paralympic track and field trials, recording a time of 10.85 seconds to beat the previous record held by Marlon Shirley by 0.06 seconds. This record was beaten in July 2013 at the 2013 IPC Athletics World Championships at the Stade du Rhône in Lyon when American athlete Richard Browne recorded a time of 10.83 in the T44 100m semi-finals.

At the 2012 Summer Paralympics, Peacock won the 100m T44 final with a time of 10.90 seconds, claiming the gold and the Paralympic record in the process. The win made his coach, Dan Pfaff, the only man to have coached 100m gold medalists in both the Olympics and the Paralympics; Pfaff coached Canada's Donovan Bailey, the gold medalist in the 1996 Summer Olympics in Atlanta.

Peacock pulled out of the 2015 IPC Athletics World Championships due to a sore on his stump that developed over the summer.

At the 2016 Summer Paralympics, Peacock defended his title, winning gold in the T44 100m, in 10.81 seconds.

From September 2017 Peacock was a contestant on series 15 of the BBC One programme Strictly Come Dancing, becoming the first amputee paralympian to compete on the show. Partnered with Oti Mabuse, they were the eighth couple to be eliminated, at the show in Blackpool.

Peacock appeared on the 15th Series of Who Do You Think You Are?, which aired in 2018.

Peacock was a late addition to the British team for the postponed 2020 Summer Paralympics in Tokyo on 21 July 2021. The other additions were David Weir, Kadeena Cox and Libby Clegg. He was part of the team to win silver in the Mixed 4 × 100 m relay, also winning an individual bronze in the men's 100m T64. He shared the medal with Johannes Floors, after the pair finished in exactly the same time.

In August 2021, Peacock made a guest appearance in the Channel 4 soap opera Hollyoaks. His scenes involved comforting character Sid Sumner (Billy Price) on insecurities about his recent amputation.

His television series Jonnie's Blade Camp was screened on Channel 4 in August 2021.

In 2022 Peacock took part in the Taskmaster 'New Year Treat II', although he was absent from the studio segments due to illness. In 2024 he appeared as a judge for BBC's Great British Menu which celebrated the 2024 Paris Olympics. In August 2024 he stated he was firmly ambitious and confident of preparing for his third Paralympic Games medal in Paris 2024. He finished fifth in the final. He was also part of the 4x100m universal relay team alongside Zac Shaw, Ali Smith (athlete) and Sammi Kinghorn which won a silver medal behind China.

== Personal life ==
Peacock's long-term girlfriend is fellow paralympian Sally Brown, from Northern Ireland.

== Honours ==
Peacock was appointed Member of the Order of the British Empire (MBE) in the 2013 New Year Honours for services to athletics.
