= Torben Schmidtke =

German Paralympic swimmer

Personal information
- Born: 24 February 1989 (age 37) Schwerin, West Germany
- Height: 155 cm (5 ft 1 in)
- Weight: 59 kg (130 lb)

Sport
- Country: Germany
- Sport: Paralympic swimming
- Disability: Dysmelia
- Disability class: S8, SB7, SM8
- Club: SC Potsdam
Medal record
Paralympic swimming
Representing Germany
Paralympic Games
Silver medal – second place	2012 London	Men's 100m breaststroke SB6
Bronze medal – third place	2016 Rio de Janeiro	Men's 100m breaststroke SB6
World Championships
Silver medal – second place	2013 Montreal	Men's 100m breaststroke SB6
Bronze medal – third place	2015 Glasgow	Men's 100m breaststroke SB6
European Championships
Silver medal – second place	2014 Eindhoven	Men's 100m breaststroke SB6
Silver medal – second place	2018 Dublin	Men's 100m breaststroke SB7
Bronze medal – third place	2016 Funchal	Men's 100m breaststroke SB6

Torben Schmidtke (born 24 February 1989) is a German Paralympic swimmer who competes in international level events. He specialises in freestyle swimming and breaststroke swimming where he has won two Paralympic medals, two World medals and three European medals.

Schmidtke was born with dysmelia in his legs and has three fingers on his left hand, he had his right foot amputated in October 2018 due to severe pain relating to his health condition. As well as swimming, he works for the German Federal Police as an IT specialist in Potsdam.
