= Richard Browne (athletics) =

Paralympic sprinter

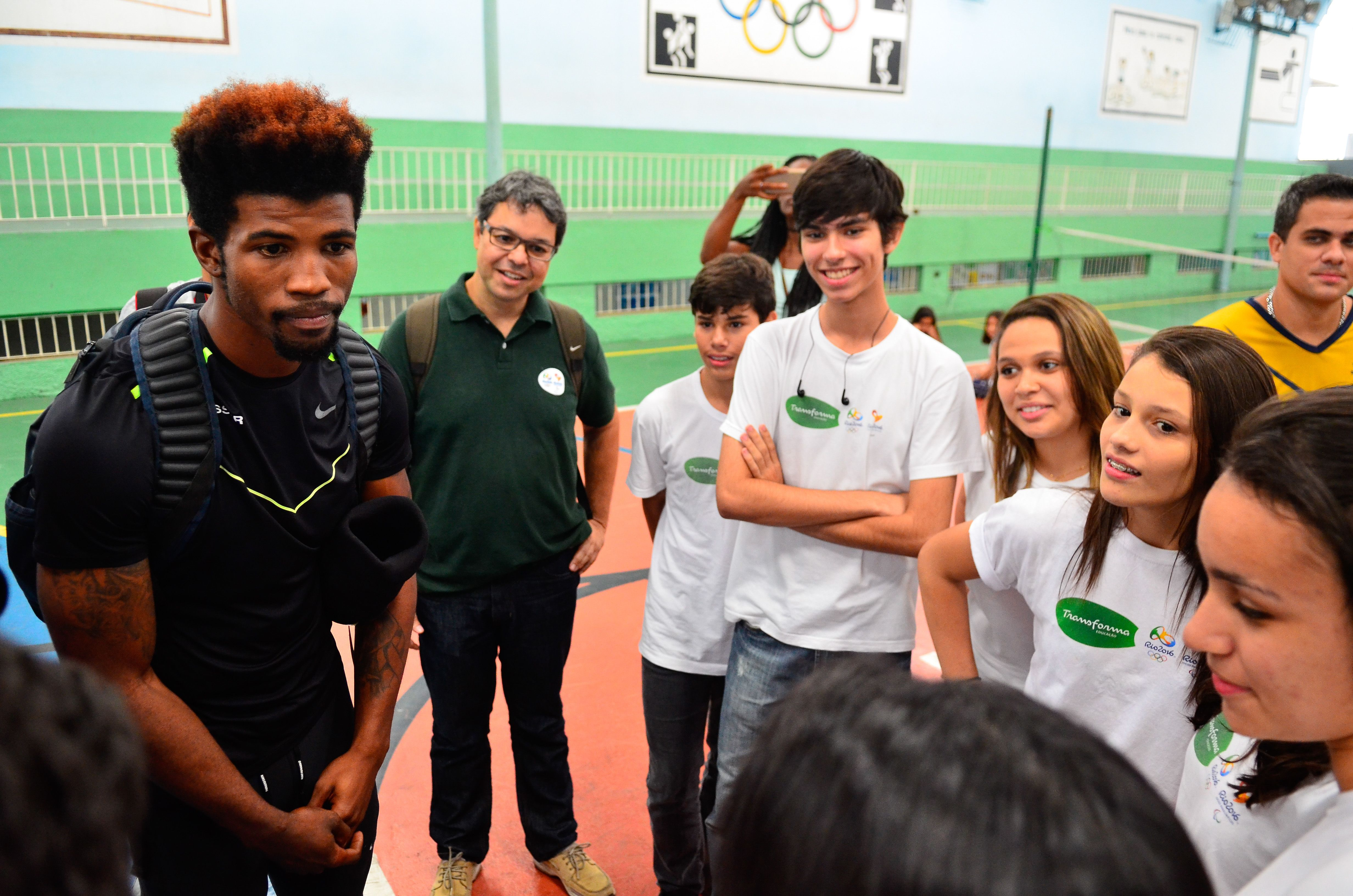
- Browne meets students in Brazil (Fernando Frazão/Agência Brasil)

Personal information
- Born: July 9, 1991 (age 35) Jackson MS, USA

Sport
- Disability: T44
- Coached by: Hayley Ginn
Medal record
Track and field (athletics)
Representing United States
Paralympic Games
Silver medal – second place	2012 London	Men's 100m T44
IPC World Championships
Gold medal – first place	2013 Lyon	Men's 4x100m relay
Gold medal – first place	2015 Doha	Men's 100m T44
Gold medal – first place	2015 Doha	Men's 200m T44
Silver medal – second place	2013 Lyon	Men's 100m T44
International 5 Nations Match
Gold medal – first place	2014 Glasgow	Men's 60m T44

Richard Browne (born July 9, 1991 in Jackson, Mississippi) is an American sprint runner. In 2007 an accident sent him through a plate glass window, which resulted in an arterial bleed causing permanent damage to his right leg. In 2010, after 14 surgical operations, his leg was amputated. "I was 16 years old in the prime of my life. I go through a window one day and from that point on my life is changed forever".

At the 2012 Paralympic Games, he won a Silver Medal in the 100m event. In July 2013 at the 2013 IPC Athletics World Championships at the Stade du Rhône in Lyon he broke Jonnie Peacock's world record when he recorded a time of 10.83 in the T44 100m semi-finals. He subsequently broke the T44 100m world record with a time of 10.75 in the 2013 Paralympic Anniversary Games in London. On April 18, 2014 Browne broke the T44 200m World Record, 21.91 (+1.4) at the Mt. Sac Relays in Los Angeles, CA. He also holds the world record over the T44 60m with an official time of 6.99. Browne ran the Emory Crossplex Invitational in Birmingham, AL on January 28, 2013. In 2013 Browne became the first T44 sprinter in history to compete in a world class able-body field when he ran at the 2013 Millrose Games in New York, NY. An equipment failure forced him to pull out of the race 10m before the finish line. In 2014 he again lined up in an international able-body 60m field at the Meeting De Mondeville in France.

== See also ==
- The Mechanics of Running Blades
