= David Prince =

American Paralympic sprinter

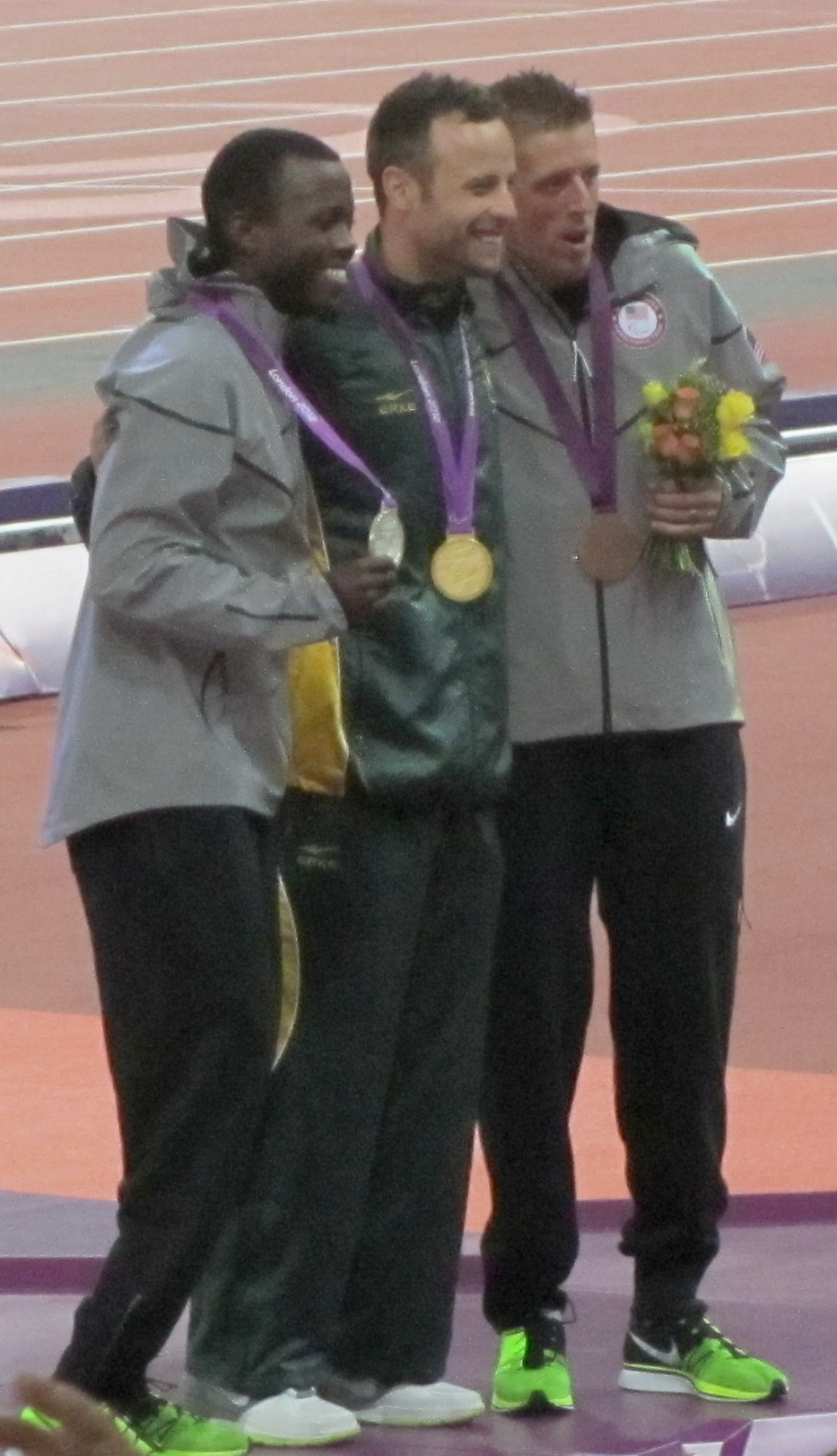
- Prince (right) with Blake Leeper and Oscar Pistorius at the 2012 Paralympics Men's 400m T44 victory ceremony

Personal information
- Born: 10 September 1983 (age 42)

Sport
- Country: United States
- Sport: Paralympic athletics
- Disability class: T44
Medal record
Paralympic athletics
Representing United States
Paralympic Games
Bronze medal – third place	2012 London	400m T43/44
IPC Athletics World Championships
Gold medal – first place	2013 Lyon	400m T44
Silver medal – second place	2013 Lyon	200m T44
Parapan American Games
Gold medal – first place	2011 Guadalajara	200m T44
Gold medal – first place	2011 Guadalajara	400m T44

David Prince (born 10 September 1983) is an American sprint runner who runs in the T44 class. He was raised by missionary parents and traveled frequently, living for a while in Oaxaca, Mexico. He lost his right leg below the knee in a motorcycle accident in 2002.

== Athletics career ==
In 2010, Prince won a gold medal at the U.S. Paralympic National Championship in the 400m event, a silver medal in the long jump and a bronze medal in the 200m event. In 2011, Prince won a gold medal at the 2011 Parapan American Games in the 200m and 400m events. In 2011 at the IPC World Championship, he won a silver medal in the 4 × 100 m relay and a bronze medal in the 400m event. In 2011 U.S. at the Paralympic National Championship, he won a gold medal in the 200m and 400m events and a silver medal in the 100m race.

Prince narrowly missed qualifying for the 2008 Paralympic Games in Beijing, China. In the 2012 Paralympic Games, Prince won an individual bronze medal in the 400 meter T43/44 event, in a new world record time for his own T44 classification.

== See also ==
- The Mechanics of Running Blades
