= Liam Malone =

New Zealand para-athlete (born 1993)

Liam Malone MNZM
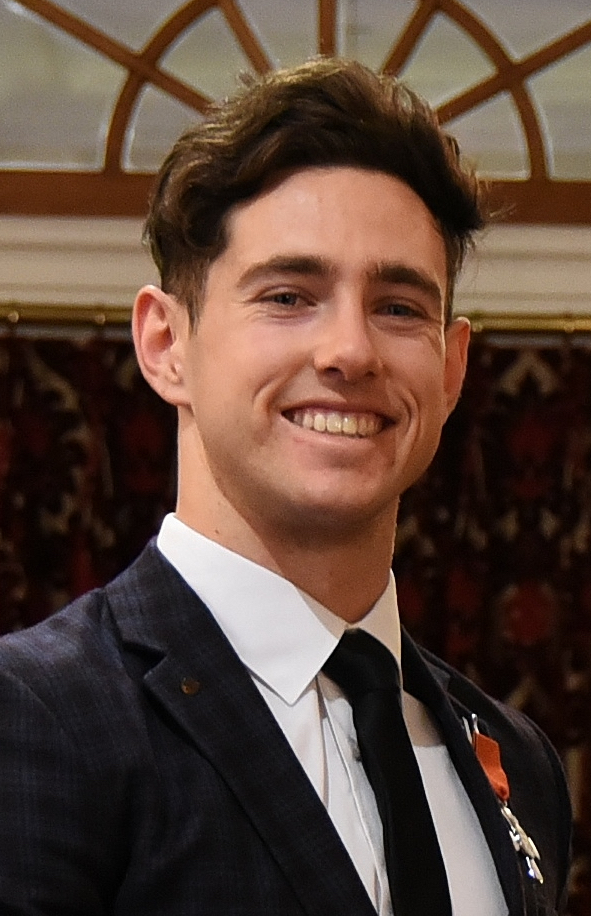
- Malone in 2017

Personal information
- Born: Liam Bevan Malone; 23 December 1993 (age 32) Nelson, New Zealand
- Relatives: Peter Malone (grandfather); Robert Trimble (3×great-grandfather); Abel Heywood (4×great-grandfather); William Malone (3×great-uncle)

Sport
- Country: New Zealand
- Sport: Athletics
- Disability class: T43
- Club: Athletics Nelson
- Coached by: Brodie Hewlett (2014–2016); James Mortimer (2016–2017)
Medal record
Men's para athletics
Representing New Zealand
Summer Paralympics
Gold medal – first place	2016 Rio de Janeiro	200 metres T44
Gold medal – first place	2016 Rio de Janeiro	400 metres T44
Silver medal – second place	2016 Rio de Janeiro	100 metres T44

Liam Bevan Malone MNZM (born 23 December 1993) is a former New Zealand para-athlete, primarily competing in sprint events. He represented New Zealand at the 2016 Summer Paralympics in Rio de Janeiro, where he won gold medals in the men's 200 metres T44 and 400 metres T44, and the silver medal in the men's 100 metres T44.

== Personal life ==
Malone was born in Nelson, the son of Murray Robert Malone and Trudi Scott. He grew up in the suburb of Stoke and was educated at Nayland College. He is the grandson of Peter Malone, who served as the mayor of Nelson from 1980 to 1992. He is also the great-great-great-grandson of Robert Trimble, a 19th-century member of the New Zealand Parliament, and the great-great-great-great-grandson of Abel Heywood, who served two separate terms as mayor of Manchester in the 1860s and 1870s. Malone is also the great-great-great-nephew of Lieutenant Colonel William George Malone, who commanded the Wellington Infantry Battalion at Gallipoli.

Malone was born with fibular hemimelia (congenital absence of the fibula bone) in both legs. As a result, his legs were amputated just above his ankles when he was 18 months old.

== Career ==
As a double below-knee amputee, Malone is classified T43 for running events. His maximum permitted standing height on prosthetics is 1.877 m (6 ft 1.9 in).

Malone was officially selected to represent New Zealand at the 2016 Summer Paralympics on 23 May 2016. At the Paralympics, he won the silver medal in the men's 100 metres T44, and the gold medals in the men's 200 metres T44 and men's 400 metres T44. His two gold medals were achieved in Paralympic record time, taking the records from disgraced South African sprinter Oscar Pistorius.

Malone was selected as New Zealand's flag bearer for the 2016 Summer Paralympics closing ceremony. He was appointed a Member of the New Zealand Order of Merit in the 2017 New Year Honours, for his services to athletics.

Malone announced his retirement from athletics in January 2018.

Malone began working in Artificial Intelligence start-up Soul Machines immediately after retirement. The company is led by Oscar Award winner Dr Mark Sagar.

Malone is also a popular keynote speaker and is represented by Celebrity Speakers New Zealand.

== Personal bests ==
Event	Result (wind)	Date	Location	Notes
100 m (T43)	10.90 (+0.9 m/s)	8 September 2016	Rio de Janeiro, Brazil	AR
200 m (T43)	21.06 (+0.6 m/s)	12 September 2016	Rio de Janeiro, Brazil	PR, AR
400 m (T43)	46.20	15 September 2016	Rio de Janeiro, Brazil	PR

Awards
Preceded by Sophie Pascoe	Halberg Awards – Disabled Sportsperson of the Year; 2016	Succeeded by Sophie Pascoe
