= Hunter Woodhall =

American Paralympic athlete (born 1999)

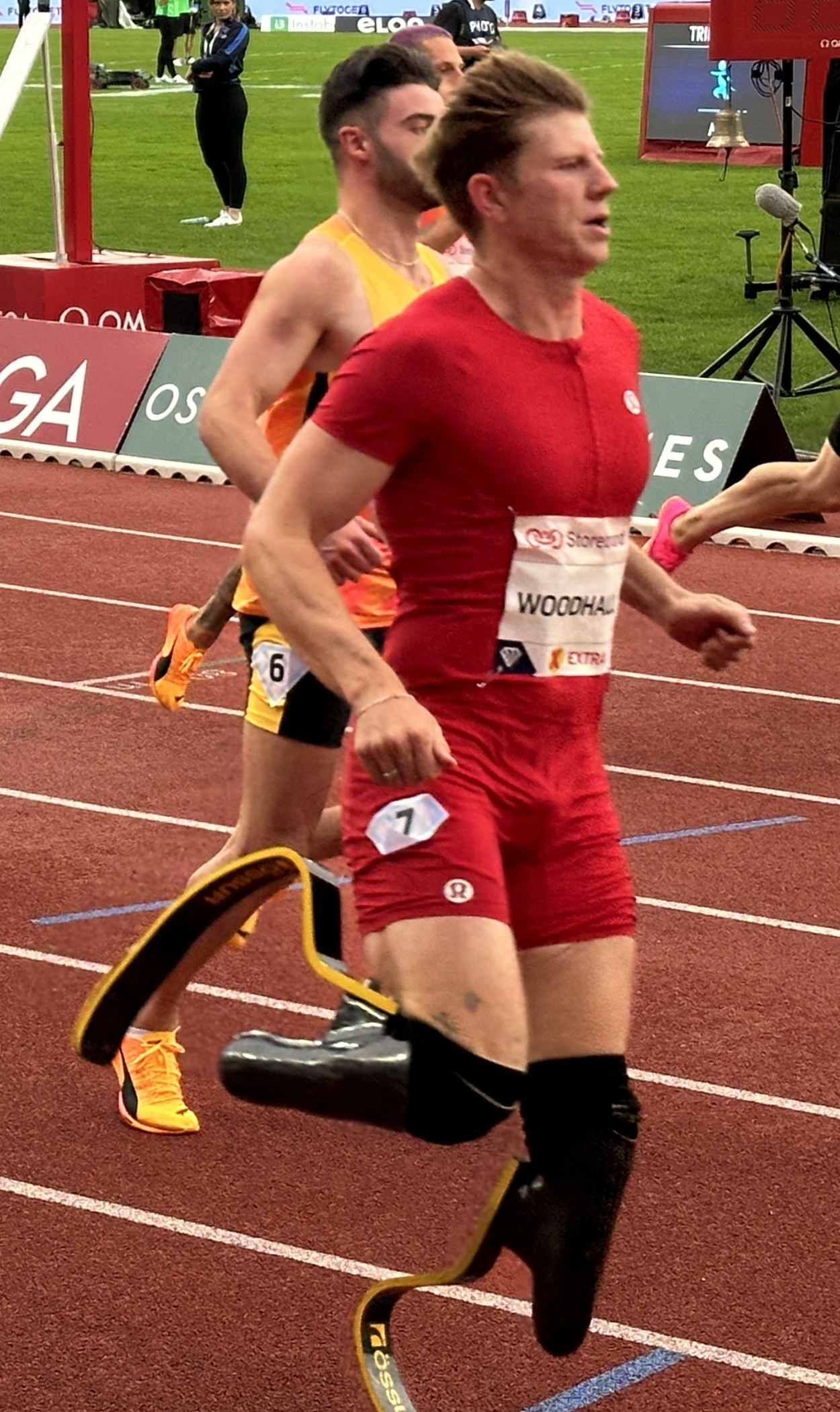
- Woodhall at the 2024 Bislett Games

Personal information
- Born: February 17, 1999 (age 27) Cartersville, Georgia, U.S.
- Home town: Syracuse, Utah, U.S.
- Education: University of Arkansas
- Spouse: Tara Davis-Woodhall (m. 2022)

Sport
- Country: United States
- Sport: Track and Field
Medal record
Representing the United States
Paralympic athletics
Summer Paralympics
| Gold medal – first place | 2024 Paris | 400 m T62 |
| Silver medal – second place | 2016 Rio de Janeiro | 200 m T44 |
| Bronze medal – third place | 2016 Rio de Janeiro | 400 m T44 |
| Bronze medal – third place | 2020 Tokyo | 400 m T62 |
| Bronze medal – third place | 2024 Paris | mixed 4 × 100 m relay |
World Championships
| Silver medal – second place | 2024 Kobe | 100 m T64 |
| Silver medal – second place | 2024 Kobe | 400 m T62 |

Hunter Ryan Woodhall (born February 17, 1999) is an American track and field athlete. He won a gold medal in Men's 400 m T62 at the 2024 Summer Paralympics, following a bronze medal in the same event at the 2020 Summer Paralympics.

He made his international debut in 2015 with a silver and bronze medal at the 2015 IPC Athletics World Championships and later won a bronze and silver medal at the 2016 Summer Paralympics. After graduating from Syracuse High School, he became the first double amputee to earn an NCAA Division I scholarship.

== Early life ==
Woodhall was born in Georgia, United States while his father was serving in the military. Woodhall's parents decided to amputate both of his legs at 11 months old due to fibular hemimelia. Raised in Syracuse, Utah, he was homeschooled until fifth grade and upon entering public school he was bullied for his disability. Although he was initially given prosthetic legs, Woodhall switched to carbon fiber "blades" for running and joined a track team.

== Career ==
While attending Syracuse High School, Woodhall competed with the United States National Paralympic Team in international competitions. He made his international debut in 2015 with a silver and bronze medal at the 2015 IPC Athletics World Championships.

By his senior year, Woodhall was ranked 20th across America in the 400 m run with a time of 47.32 seconds. He competed in the 2016 Summer Paralympics where he won a bronze medal in the men's 400 meter and a silver medal in the men's 200 meter. As a result, Syracuse City's Mayor, Terry Palmer, deemed September 15 "Hunter Woodhall Day." By the conclusion of his high school education, Woodhall was named 2016 Male High School Track Athlete of the Year. Upon graduating, Woodhall became the first double-amputee track and field athlete to earn a Division I athletic scholarship, which he accepted at the University of Arkansas.

In his first year at the University of Arkansas, Woodhall competed in the SEC Conference alongside non-disabled runners. He competed in six indoor meetings, running 1:58.04 over 800 meters and seven outdoor meetings, running 47.42 seconds over 400 meters. His times earned him a bronze medal in the 4 × 100 meter at the SEC Outdoor Championships. By the conclusion of the season, he was nominated for NCAA Game Changer of the Year and named a First-Team All-American in the 4 × 400 meter Relay and Distance Medley Relay. During his sophomore and junior years, Woodhall ran a lifetime-best 46.22 seconds in the 400 meter at the SEC outdoor championships and became a three-time All-American in the 4 x 400 meter. While in his junior year, Woodhall joined the video sharing app TikTok where he shared the story of how he lost his legs. As a result, he was invited to The Ellen DeGeneres Show where he was given $20,000 to help him with his 2020 Paralympic goals.

Woodhall won a gold medal at the 400-meter T62 event at the 2024 Summer Paralympics. He celebrated with his wife Tara Davis-Woodhall, who had previously won gold at the 2024 Summer Olympics. He also won bronze in the 4 × 100 m Universal Relay where he ran the 3rd leg.

== Personal life ==
On October 16, 2022, Woodhall married his longtime girlfriend, Olympian Tara Davis-Woodhall. They had met at a track meet in Idaho in 2017. They operate a YouTube channel together. The Woodhalls' celebration of Davis-Woodhall's win in the women's long jump at the 2024 Summer Olympics received significant media attention.
