= David Behre =

German Paralympic sprinter

Personal information
- Born: Duisburg, Germany
Medal record
Track and field (athletics)
Representing Germany
Paralympic Games
Gold medal – first place	2016 Rio de Janeiro	4x100m - T42-47
Bronze medal – third place	2012 London	4x100m - T42-46
IPC World Championships
Gold medal – first place	2015 Doha	400m - T44
IPC Athletics European Championships
Gold medal – first place	2014 Swansea	200m - T44
Gold medal – first place	2014 Swansea	400m - T44
Gold medal – first place	2016 Grosseto	4x100m relay - T42-47
Silver medal – second place	2012 Stadskanaal	200m - T44
Silver medal – second place	2016 Grosseto	400m - T44

David Behre (born 13 September 1986 in Duisburg) is a German Paralympic sprint runner in the T43 class. He is a double leg amputee who lost both feet in September 2007 when his bicycle was hit by a train. While recovering in the hospital, he saw a documentary on runner Oscar Pistorius and decided to become a sprint runner.

Behre holds the German record in the 100 meters event with a time of 11.66 seconds, the European records in the 200 meters event with a time of 23.14s and the 400 meters event with a time of 51.40s. At the 2012 Paralympic Games, Behre won a bronze medal as part of the German 4 × 100 m relay team.

== See also ==
- The Mechanics of Running Blades
