= Johannes Floors =

German Paralympic athlete

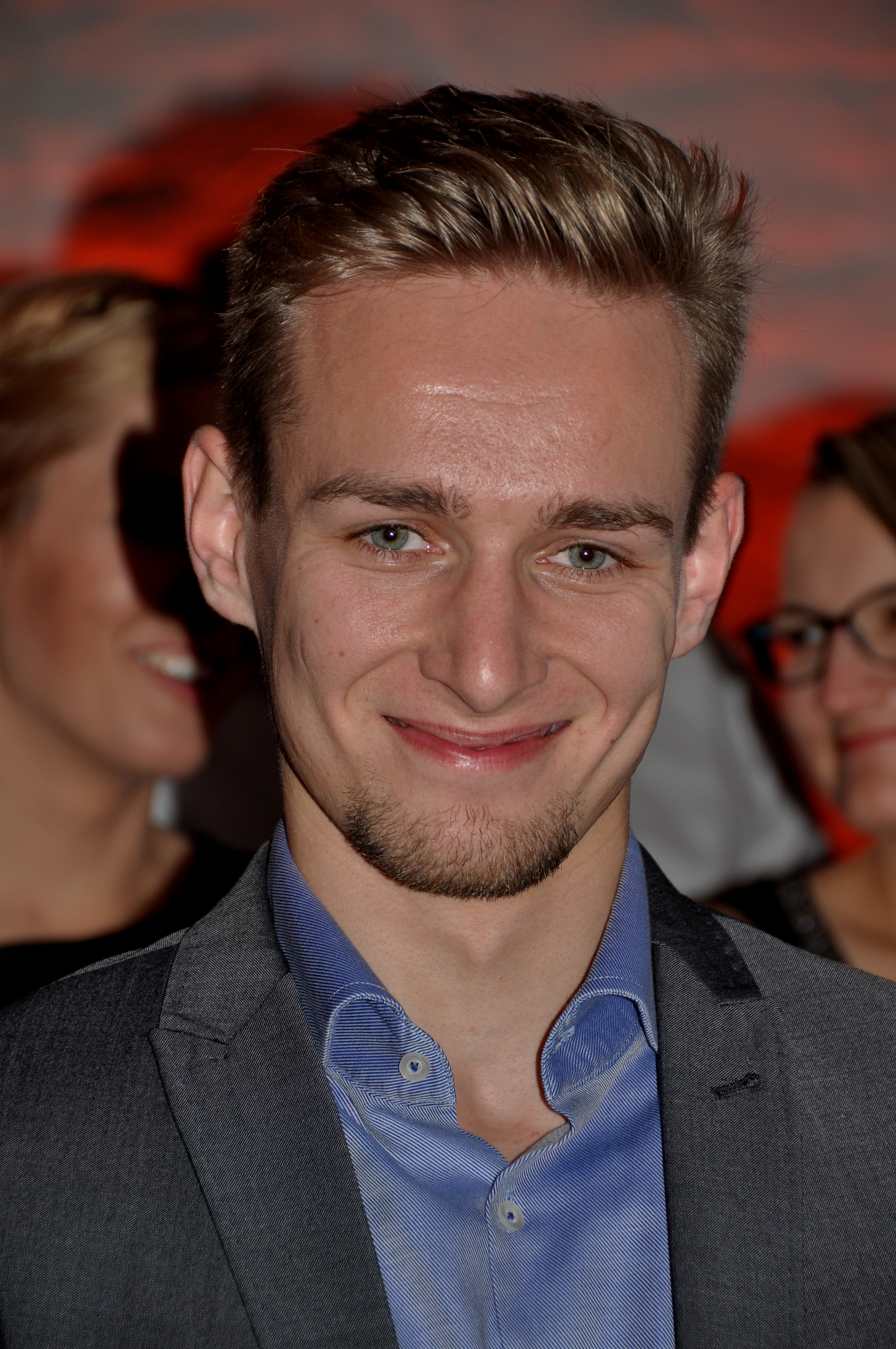
- Johannes Floors (2017)

Personal information
- Born: 8 February 1995 (age 31) Bissendorf, Germany
- Height: 1.80 m (5 ft 11 in)

Sport
- Sport: Athletics
- Disability class: T43
- Event: sprint
- Club: Bayer Leverkusen AC
- Coached by: Karl-Heinz Due

Achievements and titles
- Paralympic finals: 2016, 2020, 2024
Medal record
Representing Germany
Paralympic Games
| Gold medal – first place | 2016 Rio | 4×100 m T42-47 |
| Gold medal – first place | 2020 Tokyo | 400 m T62 |
| Silver medal – second place | 2024 Paris | 400 m T62 |
| Bronze medal – third place | 2020 Tokyo | 100 m T64 |
World Championships
| Gold medal – first place | 2015 Doha | 4×100 m T42-47 |
| Gold medal – first place | 2023 Paris | 400 m T62 |
| Gold medal – first place | 2024 Kobe | 400 m T62 |
| Gold medal – first place | 2025 New Delhi | 400 m T62 |
| Silver medal – second place | 2025 New Delhi | 100 m T64 |
European Championships
| Gold medal – first place | 2016 Grosseto | 200 m T44 |
| Gold medal – first place | 2016 Grosseto | 400 m T44 |
| Gold medal – first place | 2016 Grosseto | 4×100 m T42-47 |
| Bronze medal – third place | 2016 Grosseto | 100 m T44 |

Johannes Floors (born 8 February 1995) is a German para-athlete. A bilateral lower limb amputee, Floors competes in sprint events, competing in the T43 classification.

== Career ==
He has won medals at both European and World Championship level and was part of the German Athletics at the 2016 Summer Paralympics – Men's 4 × 100 metres relay team that won gold at the 2016 Summer Paralympics in Rio.

== Personal life ==
Floors was born in Bissendorf, Germany, in 1995. He was born without his right foot and part of his lower shin.
