= 2016 London Marathon =

36th annual marathon race in London

36th London Marathon
- Venue: London, England, United Kingdom
- Date: 24 April 2016

Champions
- Men: Eliud Kipchoge (2:03:05)
- Women: Jemima Sumgong (2:22:58)
- Wheelchair men: Marcel Hug (1:35:19)
- Wheelchair women: Tatyana McFadden (1:44:14)

The 2016 London Marathon was the 36th running of the annual marathon race in London, England, which took place on Sunday, 24 April. The men's elite race was won by Kenyan Eliud Kipchoge and the women's race was won by Kenyan Jemima Sumgong. The men's wheelchair race was won by Marcel Hug from Switzerland and the women's wheelchair race was won by American Tatyana McFadden.

Around 247,069 people applied to enter the race: 53,152 had their applications accepted and 39,523 started the race. These were all record highs for the race. A total of 39,091 runners, 23,983 men and 15,108 women, finished the race.

In the under-17 Mini Marathon, the 3-mile able-bodied and wheelchair events were won by Thomas Mortimer (14:14), Sabrina Sinha (16:23), Jack Agnew (12:18) and Kare Adenegan (13:40).

== Course ==
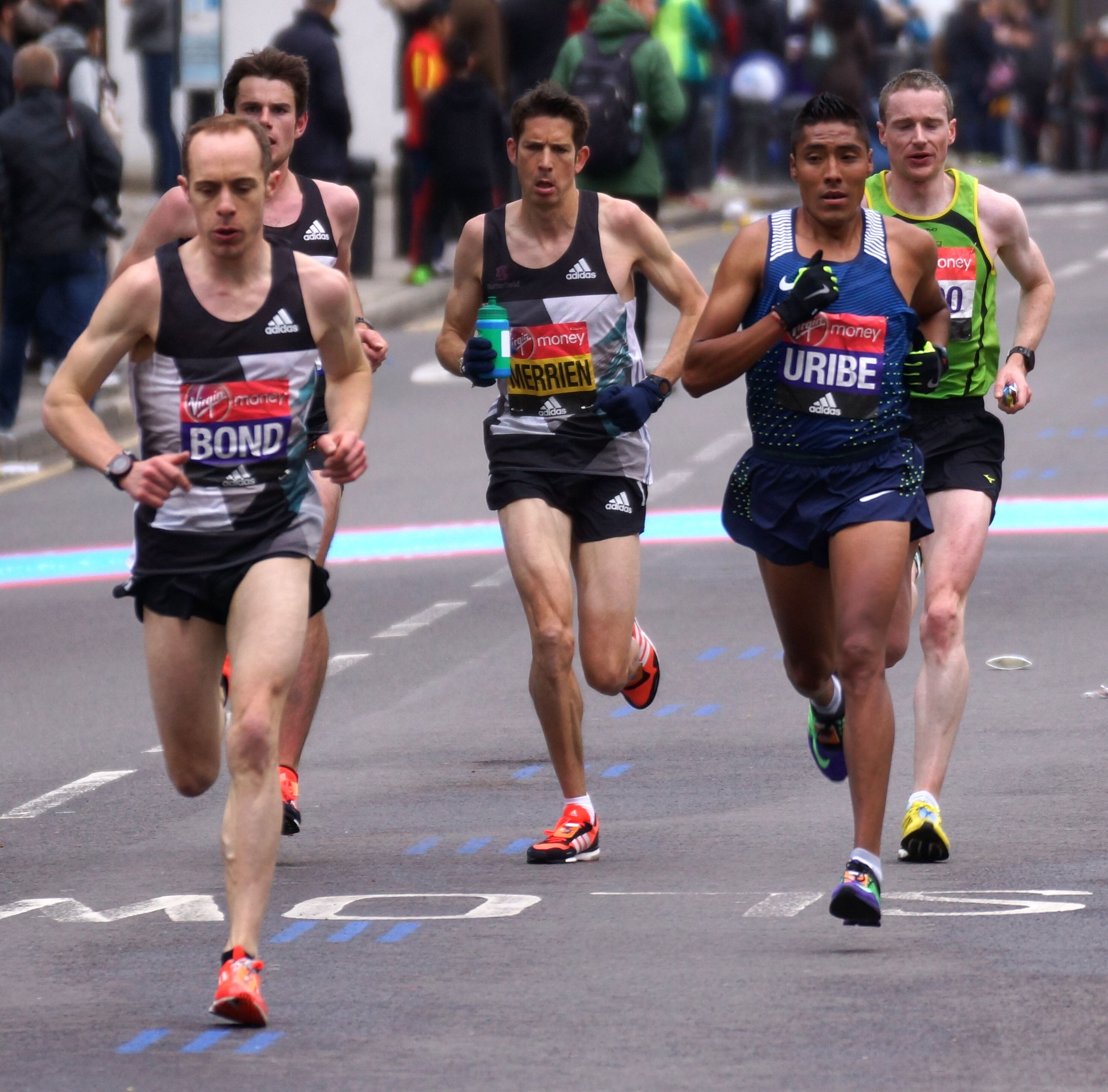
Male runners Antonio Uribe (23rd), Lee Merrien (19th), Mathew Bond (17th) and Sean Hehir.

The London Marathon is run over a largely flat course around the River Thames, and spans 42.195 kilometres (26 miles and 385 yards). The route has markers at one mile and five kilometre intervals.

The course begins at three separate points: the 'red start' in southern Greenwich Park on Charlton Way, the 'green start' in St John's Park, and the 'blue start' on Shooter's Hill Road. From these points around Blackheath at 35 m (115 ft) above sea level, south of the River Thames, the route heads east through Charlton. The three courses converge after 4.5 km (2.8 miles) in Woolwich, close to the Royal Artillery Barracks.

As the runners reach the 10 km mark (6.2-mile), they pass by the Old Royal Naval College and head towards Cutty Sark drydocked in Greenwich. Heading next into Deptford and Surrey Quays in the Docklands, and out towards Bermondsey, competitors race along Jamaica Road before reaching the half-way point as they cross Tower Bridge. Running east again along The Highway through Wapping, competitors head up towards Limehouse and into Mudchute in the Isle of Dogs via Westferry Road, before heading into Canary Wharf.

As the route leads away from Canary Wharf into Poplar, competitors run west down Poplar High Street back towards Limehouse and on through Commercial Road. They then move back onto The Highway, onto Lower and Upper Thames Streets. Heading into the final leg of the race, competitors pass The Tower of London on Tower Hill. In the penultimate mile along The Embankment, the London Eye comes into view, before the athletes turn right into Birdcage Walk to complete the final 352 m (385 yards), catching the sights of Big Ben and Buckingham Palace, and finishing in The Mall alongside St. James's Palace.

== Race summary ==
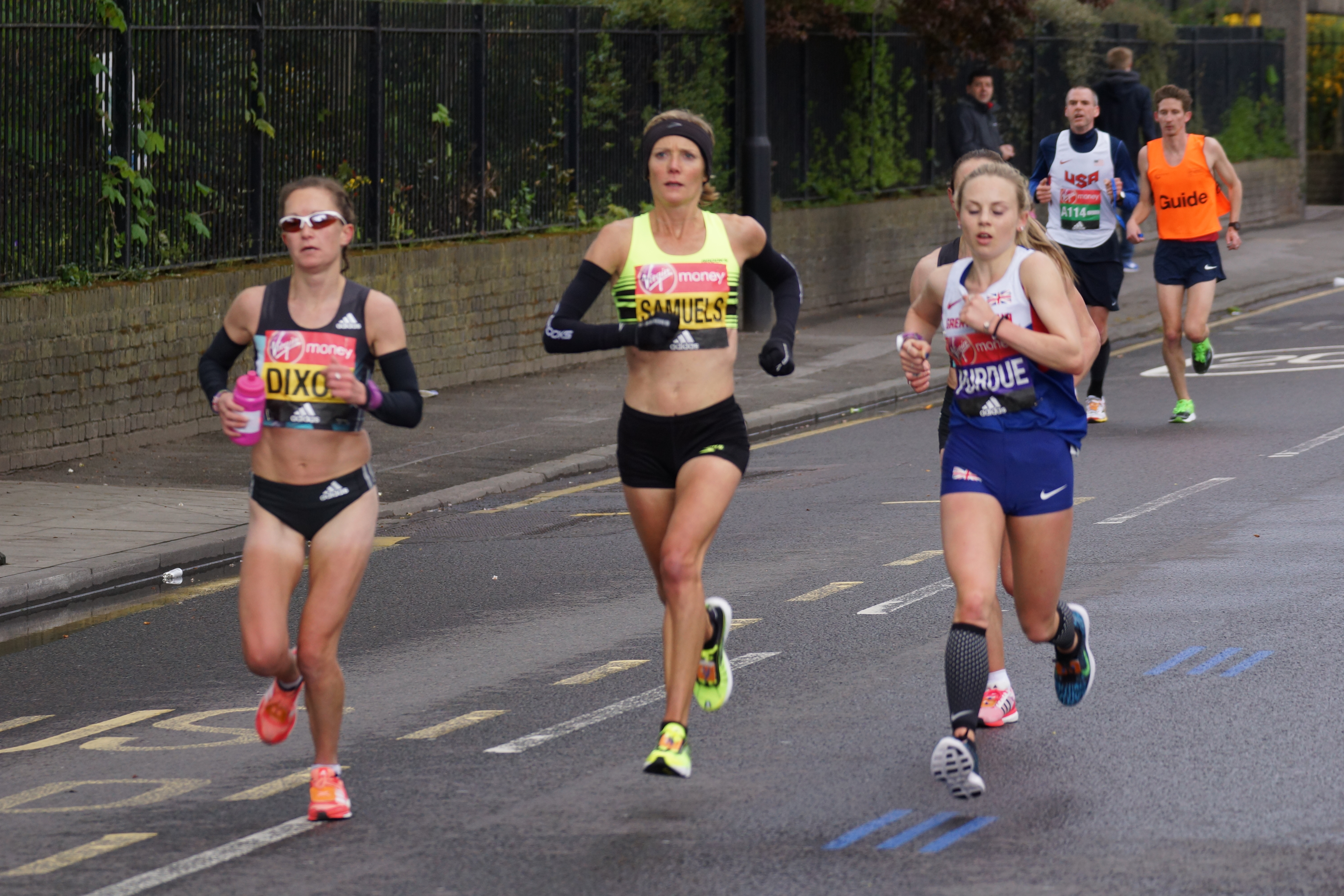
Women's elite runners Charlotte Purdue (16th), Sonia Samuels (14th) and Alyson Dixon (13th).

The men's race was won by Kenyan Eliud Kipchoge in a new course record, eight seconds shy of the world record. Kipchoge, after running alongside Stanley Biwott for most of the race, broke off to defend the title he won the previous year. The women's race was won by Kenyan Jemima Sumgong, who fell along with two-time winner Mary Keitany and 2010 winner Aselefech Mergia in the latter stages of the race. Sumgong recovered to take the finish line, in front of 2015 winner Tigist Tufa.

Coming less than a week after the Boston Marathon, the same winners won the London wheelchair races. Marcel Hug from Switzerland won the men's wheelchair division and the women's wheelchair division was won by American Tatyana McFadden. Hug won ahead of course record holder Kurt Fearnley and six-time winner David Weir, with the top three finishers each separated by a second. McFadden held off Manuela Schär by a single second to claim her fourth consecutive title, with 2010 winner Wakako Tsuchida coming in third.

Astronaut Tim Peake ran the London Marathon from the International Space Station's treadmill, timed to begin just as the race did. Peake became the first man to run a marathon from space, and the second person after Sunita Williams ran the 2007 Boston Marathon from the ISS.

== Results ==
=== Men ===
Position	Athlete	Nationality	Time
1st place, gold medalist(s)	Eliud Kipchoge	Kenya	2:03:05
2nd place, silver medalist(s)	Stanley Biwott	Kenya	2:03:51
3rd place, bronze medalist(s)	Kenenisa Bekele	Ethiopia	2:06:36
4	Ghirmay Ghebreslassie	Eritrea	2:07:46
5	Wilson Kipsang Kiprotich	Kenya	2:07:52
6	Tilahun Regassa	Ethiopia	2:09:47
7	Sisay Lemma	Ethiopia	2:10:45
8	Callum Hawkins	United Kingdom	2:10:52
9	Dennis Kipruto Kimetto	Kenya	2:11:44
10	Ghebrezgiabhier Kibrom	Eritrea	2:11:56
11	Yuki Sato	Japan	2:12:14
12	Tsegai Tewelde	United Kingdom	2:12:23
13	Vitaliy Shafar	Ukraine	2:12:36
14	Derek Hawkins	United Kingdom	2:12:57
15	Serhiy Lebid	Ukraine	2:14:07
16	Chris Thompson	United Kingdom	2:15:05
17	Matthew Bond	United Kingdom	2:15:32
18	Robbie Simpson	United Kingdom	2:15:38
19	Lee Merrien	Guernsey	2:16:42
20	Sean Hehir	Ireland	2:17:23
21	Paul Martelletti	United Kingdom	2:17:30
22	Andrew Davies	United Kingdom	2:17:45
23	Robyn Watson	Canada	2:18:45
24	Thomas Frazer	Ireland	2:19:21
25	Aaron Scott	United Kingdom	2:19:22
26	Ben Moreau	United Kingdom	2:19:43
27	José Antonio Uribe Marino	Mexico	2:20:21
28	Stephen Scullion	United Kingdom	2:20:39
29	Steve Way	United Kingdom	2:20:54
30	Thomas Payn	United Kingdom	2:21:25
—	Boniface Toroitich Kiprop	Kenya	DNF
—	Gideon Kipketer	Kenya	DNF
—	Wilfred Kirwa Kigen	Kenya	DNF
—	Kevin Kipruto Kochei	Kenya	DNF
—	Ezrah Kiprotich Sang	Kenya	DNF
—	Cosmas Lagat	Kenya	DNF
—	Gervais Hakizimana	Rwanda	DNF
—	Samuel Tsegay	Eritrea	DNF
—	Amanuel Mesel	Eritrea	DNF
—	Arne Gabius	Germany	DNF
—	Marcin Chabowski	Poland	DNF
—	Scott Overall	United Kingdom	DNF

=== Women ===
Position	Athlete	Nationality	Time
1st place, gold medalist(s)	Jemima Sumgong	Kenya	2:22:58
2nd place, silver medalist(s)	Tigist Tufa	Ethiopia	2:23:03
3rd place, bronze medalist(s)	Florence Kiplagat	Kenya	2:23:39
4	Volha Mazuronak	Belarus	2:23:54
5	Aselefech Mergia	Ethiopia	2:23:57
6	Mare Dibaba	Ethiopia	2:24:09
7	Feyse Tadese	Ethiopia	2:25:03
8	Priscah Jeptoo	Kenya	2:27:27
9	Mary Jepkosgei Keitany	Kenya	2:28:30
10	Jéssica Augusto	Portugal	2:28:53
11	Katarzyna Kowalska	Poland	2:29:47
12	Sara Hall	United States	2:30:06
13	Alyson Dixon	United Kingdom	2:31:52
14	Sonia Samuels	United Kingdom	2:32:00
15	Irvette van Zyl	South Africa	2:32:20
16	Charlotte Purdue	United Kingdom	2:32:48
17	Tracy Barlow†	United Kingdom	2:33:25
18	Cassie Fien	Australia	2:33:36
19	Christina Muir†	United Kingdom	2:37:42
20	Freya Murray	United Kingdom	2:37:52
21	Hayley Munn†	United Kingdom	2:38:13
22	Georgie Bruinvels†	United Kingdom	2:38:20
23	René Kalmer	South Africa	2:39:44
—	Polline Wanjiku	Kenya	DNF
—	Angela Tanui	Kenya	DNF
—	Helah Kiprop	Kenya	DNF
—	Charlotte Arter	United Kingdom	DNF
—	Caryl Jones	United Kingdom	DNF

- † = Ran in mass race

=== Wheelchair men ===
Position	Athlete	Nationality	Time
1st place, gold medalist(s)	Marcel Hug	Switzerland	1:35:19
2nd place, silver medalist(s)	Kurt Fearnley	Australia	1:35:20
3rd place, bronze medalist(s)	David Weir	United Kingdom	1:35:21
4	Ernst van Dyk	South Africa	1:35:23
5	James Senbeta	United States	1:35:24
6	Hiroki Nishida	Japan	1:35:32
7	Aaron Pike	United States	1:35:33
8	Kota Hokinoue	Japan	1:35:37
9	Pierre Fairbank	France	1:35:57
10	Simon Lawson	United Kingdom	1:37:02
11	Rafael Botello	Spain	1:38:35
12	Masazumi Soejima	Japan	1:38:35
13	Laurens Molina	Costa Rica	1:38:36
14	Hong Suk-man	South Korea	1:38:37
15	Patrick Monahan	Ireland	1:38:38
16	Jose Jimenez	Costa Rica	1:38:38
17	Josh George	United States	1:38:40
18	John Smith	United Kingdom	1:38:40
19	Denis Lemeunier	France	1:38:42
20	Ryota Yoshida	Japan	1:40:34

=== Wheelchair women ===
Position	Athlete	Nationality	Time
1st place, gold medalist(s)	Tatyana McFadden	United States	1:44:14
2nd place, silver medalist(s)	Manuela Schär	Switzerland	1:44:15
3rd place, bronze medalist(s)	Wakako Tsuchida	Japan	1:45:28
4	Amanda McGrory	United States	1:47:41
5	Zou Lihong	China	1:52:42
6	Sandra Graf	Switzerland	1:52:49
7	Susannah Scaroni	United States	1:52:50
8	Chelsea McClammer	United States	1:55:58
9	Christie Dawes	Australia	1:56:46
10	Natalia Kocherova	Russia	1:58:43
11	Nikki Emerson	United Kingdom	2:20:40
12	Martyna Snopek	Poland	2:39:43
—	Aline Rocha	Brazil	DQ
—	Ma Jing	China	DQ
