= 2017 London Marathon =

37th annual marathon race in London

37th London Marathon
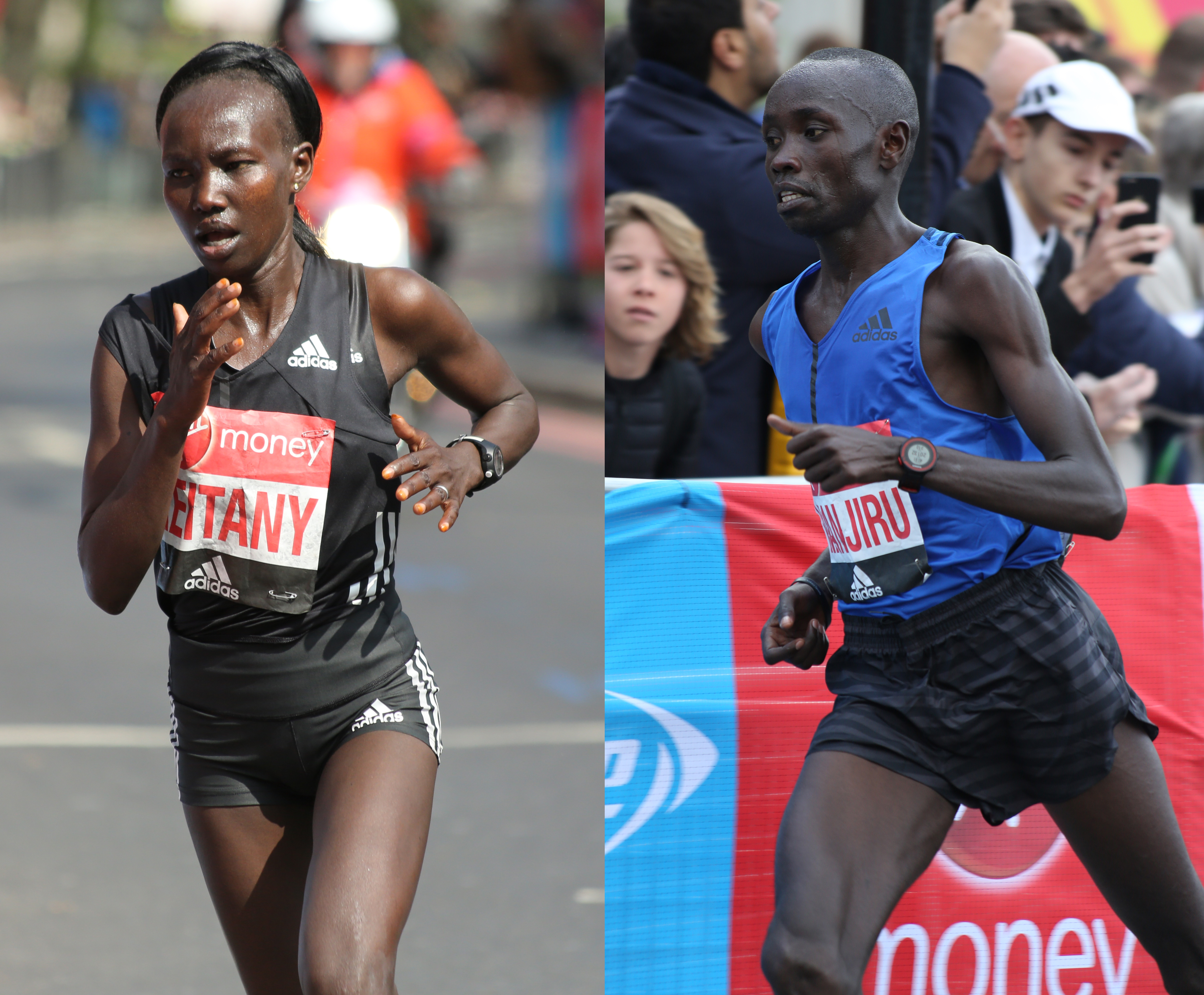
- Mary Keitany and Daniel Wanjiru
- Venue: London, England
- Date: 23 April 2017

Champions
- Men: Daniel Wanjiru (2:05:48)
- Women: Mary Keitany (2:17:01)
- Wheelchair men: David Weir (1:31:06)
- Wheelchair women: Manuela Schär (1:39:57)

The 2017 London Marathon was the 37th running of the annual marathon race in London, England, which took place on Sunday, 23 April. Mary Jepkosgei Keitany won the women's race, setting a new women-only marathon world record with a time of 2:17:01, while Daniel Wanjiru came first in the men's race in 2:05:48. David Weir claimed a record breaking seventh win at the London Marathon in the men's wheelchair event. The win broke a tie between Weir and Tanni Gray Thompson for the most wins at the London Marathon.

Around 253,930 people applied to enter the race: 53,229 had their applications accepted and 40,048 started the race. These were all record highs for the race. A total of 39,406 runners, 23,912 men and 15,494 women, finished the race.

In the under-17 Mini Marathon, the 3-mile able-bodied and wheelchair events were won by Toby Osman (14:25), Erin Wallace (16:09), Jack Agnew (11:39) and Kare Adenegan (12:51).

== Course ==
The London Marathon is run over a largely flat course around the River Thames, and spans 26 miles and 385 yards (42.195 kilometres). The route has markers at one mile and five kilometre intervals.

The course begins at three separate points: the 'red start' in southern Greenwich Park on Charlton Way, the 'green start' in St John's Park, and the 'blue start' on Shooter's Hill Road. From these points around Blackheath at 35 m (115 ft) above sea level, south of the River Thames, the route heads east through Charlton. The three courses converge after 4.5 km (2.8 miles) in Woolwich, close to the Royal Artillery Barracks.

As the runners reach the 10 km mark (6.2-mile), they pass by the Old Royal Naval College and head towards Cutty Sark drydocked in Greenwich. Heading next into Deptford and Surrey Quays in the Docklands, and out towards Bermondsey, competitors race along Jamaica Road before reaching the half-way point as they cross Tower Bridge. Running east again along The Highway through Wapping, competitors head up towards Limehouse and into Mudchute in the Isle of Dogs via Westferry Road, before heading into Canary Wharf.

As the route leads away from Canary Wharf into Poplar, competitors run west down Poplar High Street back towards Limehouse and on through Commercial Road. They then move back onto The Highway, onto Lower and Upper Thames Streets. Heading into the final leg of the race, competitors pass The Tower of London on Tower Hill. In the penultimate mile along The Embankment, the London Eye comes into view, before the athletes turn right into Birdcage Walk to complete the final 352 m (385 yards), catching the sights of Big Ben and Buckingham Palace, and finishing in The Mall alongside St. James's Palace.

== Race summary ==
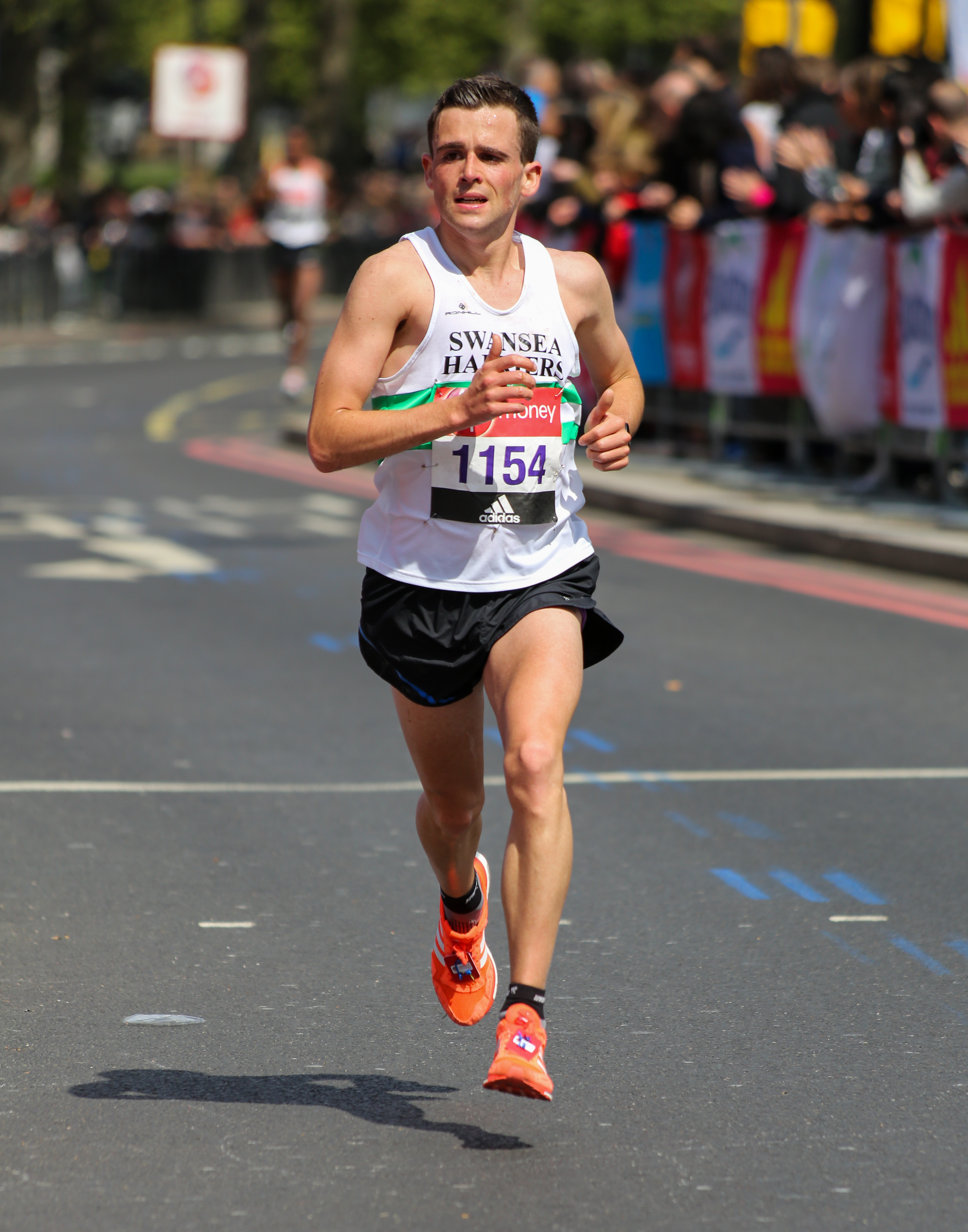
Josh Griffiths, the fastest club runner who qualified for the World Championships by finishing as the fastest British runner and 13th overall on his marathon debut.

In the women's race, Keitany was rarely threatened. She broke away from the field after the first mile and maintained a comfortable lead until the end of the race. Her final time was the second fastest in history, and the fastest set without the help of male pacemakers, beating Paula Radcliffe's record of 2:17:42 set in the 2005 race. The overall women's record, 2:15:25, was also set by Radcliffe in the 2003 race.

The men's race was largely contested between Kenya's Wanjiru and Ethiopia's Kenenisa Bekele. Bekele led until approximately halfway through the race, when he dropped back sharply. Wanjiru stayed with a lead pack of Bedan Karoki, Abel Kirui and Feyisa Lilesa until 21 miles before making a break. However, Bekele was not finished and rapidly accelerated through the field, closing the gap to eight seconds with less than a mile left. Wanjiru however found the strength to hold Bekele off, eventually winning by nine seconds.

There was also a surprise when a club runner, Josh Griffiths, who did not start with the elite athletes, finished in 2:14:49, a time which would have given him 13th place in the elite field. He qualified for the World Championships with this time. Matthew Rees helped an exhausted fellow runner, David Wyeth, across the finish line, an occurrence widely mentioned in social and traditional media.

The men's wheelchair race saw David Weir claim a record breaking seventh win at the London Marathon when he out sprinted Marcel Hug and Rafael Botello. Manuela Schär won her first title in London, finishing almost 5 minutes ahead of her nearest rival.

== Results ==
=== Men ===
Position	Athlete	Nationality	Time
1st place, gold medalist(s)	Daniel Wanjiru	Kenya	2:05:48
2nd place, silver medalist(s)	Kenenisa Bekele	Ethiopia	2:05:57
3rd place, bronze medalist(s)	Bedan Karoki Muchiri	Kenya	2:07:41
4	Abel Kirui	Kenya	2:07:45
5	Alphonce Simbu	Tanzania	2:09:10
6	Ghirmay Ghebreslassie	Eritrea	2:09:57
7	Assefa Mengistu	Ethiopia	2:10:04
8	Amanuel Mesel	Eritrea	2:10:44
9	Javier Guerra	Spain	2:10:55
10	Michael Shelley	Australia	2:11:38
11	Ayad Lamdassem	Spain	2:12:30
12	Feyisa Lilesa	Ethiopia	2:14:12
13	Ghebrezgiabhier Kibrom	Eritrea	2:14:52
14	Josh Griffiths	United Kingdom	2:14:54
15	Abdellatif Meftah	France	2:14:55
16	Robbie Simpson	United Kingdom	2:15:04
17	Andrew Davies	United Kingdom	2:15:11
18	Tesfaye Abera	Ethiopia	2:16:09
19	Sean Hehir	Ireland	2:16:23
20	Jesús Arturo Esparza	Mexico	2:16:38
21	Scott Overall	United Kingdom	2:16:54
22	Kevin Seaward	Ireland	2:17:08
23	Matthew Sharp	United Kingdom	2:17:50
24	Aaron Scott	United Kingdom	2:17:51
25	Stephen Scullion	United Kingdom	2:18:05
26	Jonathan Thewlis	United Kingdom	2:18:12
27	Tesama Moogas	Israel	2:18:33
28	Mick Clohisey	Ireland	2:18:34
29	Jonathan Mellor	United Kingdom	2:18:48
30	Tilahun Regassa	Ethiopia	2:18:53
—	Stephen Kosgei Kibet	Kenya	DNF
—	Morris Munene	Kenya	DNF
—	John Lotiang	Kenya	DNF
—	Cosmas Jairus Birech	Kenya	DNF
—	Barsilias Serem Kipyego	Kenya	DNF
—	Simon Ndirangu	Kenya	DNF

=== Women ===
Position	Athlete	Nationality	Time
1st place, gold medalist(s)	Mary Jepkosgei Keitany	Kenya	2:17:01
2nd place, silver medalist(s)	Tirunesh Dibaba	Ethiopia	2:17:56
3rd place, bronze medalist(s)	Aselefech Mergia	Ethiopia	2:23:08
4	Vivian Cheruiyot	Kenya	2:23:50
5	Lisa Jane Weightman	Australia	2:25:15
6	Laura Thweatt	United States	2:25:38
7	Helah Kiprop	Kenya	2:25:39
8	Tigist Tufa	Ethiopia	2:25:52
9	Florence Kiplagat	Kenya	2:26:25
10	Jessica Trengove	Australia	2:27:01
11	Aberu Kebede	Ethiopia	2:27:27
12	Diana Lobačevskė	Lithuania	2:28:48
13	Kellyn Taylor	United States	2:28:51
14	Alyson Dixon	United Kingdom	2:29:06
15	Charlotte Purdue	United Kingdom	2:29:23
16	Tracy Barlow	United Kingdom	2:30:42
17	Andrea Deelstra	Netherlands	2:31:32
18	Tish Jones	United Kingdom	2:33:56
19	Melanie Panayiotou	Australia	2:35:25
20	Hanna Vandenbussche	Belgium	2:37:28
21	Susan Partridge	United Kingdom	2:37:51
22	Jenny Spink	United Kingdom	2:38:11
23	Casey Wood	Australia	2:39:27
24	Laura Graham	Ireland	2:42:38
25	Krista DuChene	Canada	2:43:31
26	Barbara Sanchez	Ireland	2:47:03
—	Mare Dibaba	Ethiopia	DNF
—	Maja Neuenschwander	Switzerland	DNF
—	Jo Pavey	United Kingdom	DNF
—	Caroline Chepkoech Kipkirui	Kenya	DNF
—	Polline Wanjiku	Kenya	DNF
—	Joy Loyce	Kenya	DNF
—	Elizeba Cherono	Netherlands	DNF
—	Charlotte Arter	United Kingdom	DNF
—	Hannah Walker	United Kingdom	DNF

=== Wheelchair men ===
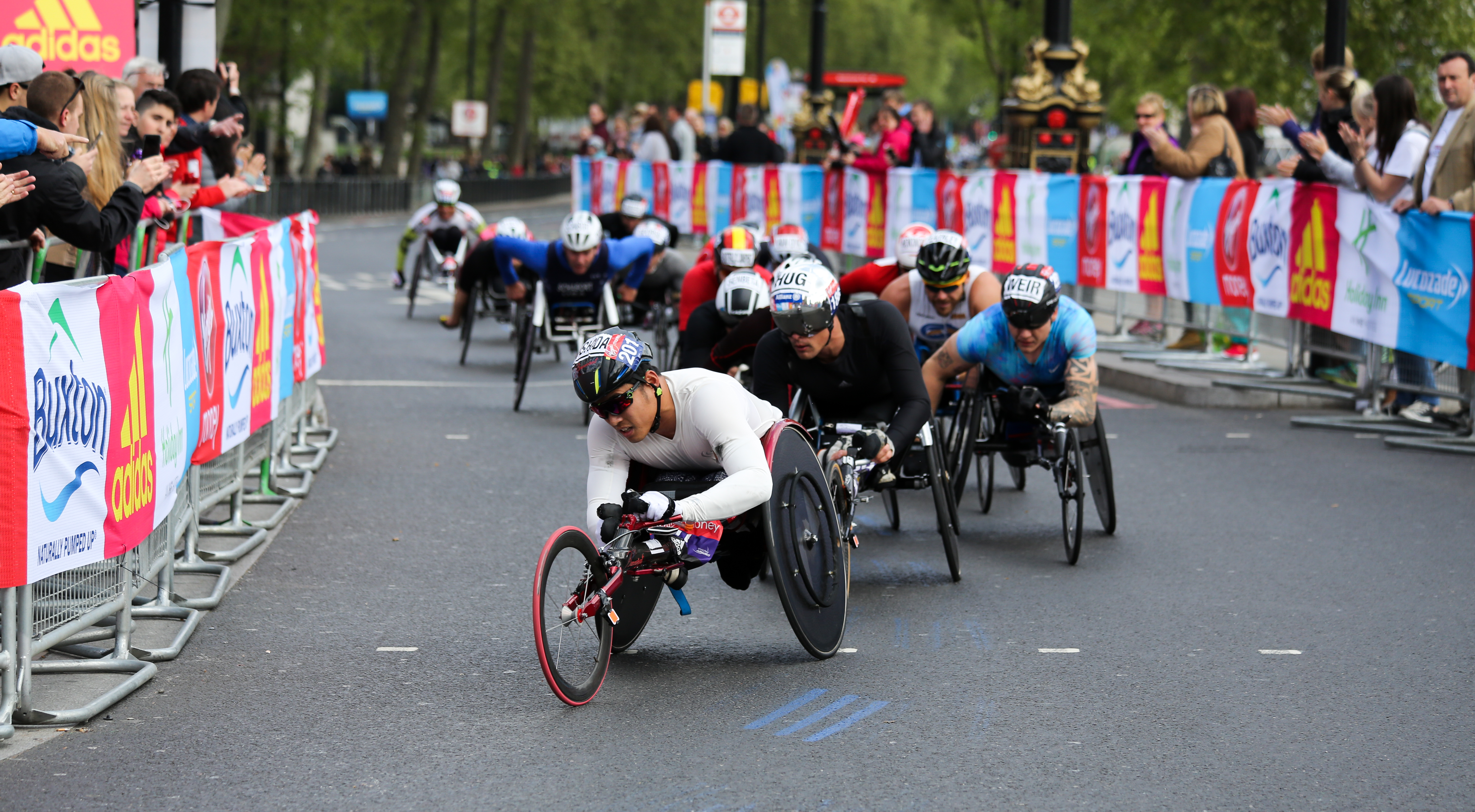
Leading men wheelchair after 25 and a quarter miles.

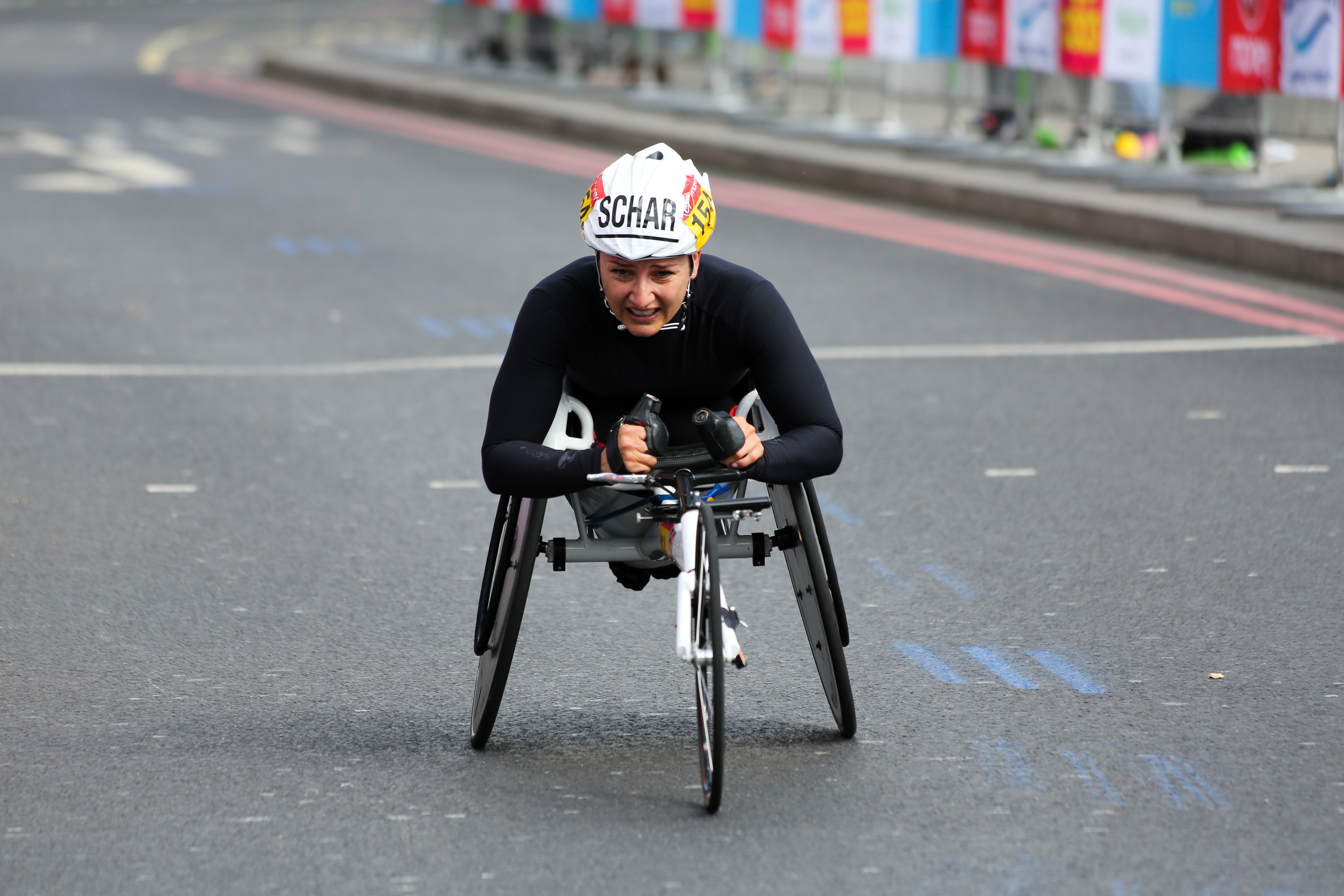
Women wheelchair winner Manuela Schär.

Position	Athlete	Nationality	Time
1st place, gold medalist(s)	David Weir	United Kingdom	1:31:06
2nd place, silver medalist(s)	Marcel Hug	Switzerland	1:31:07
3rd place, bronze medalist(s)	Kurt Fearnley	Australia	1:31:07
4	Ernst van Dyk	South Africa	1:31:08
5	Rafael Botello	Spain	1:31:09
6	Kota Hokinoue	Japan	1:31:09
7	Aaron Pike	United States	1:31:10
8	Josh George	United States	1:31:10
9	Hiroyuki Yamamoto	Japan	1:31:10
10	Krieg Schabort	United States	1:31:11
11	James Senbeta	United States	1:31:11
12	Ryota Yoshida	Japan	1:31:11
13	Hiroki Nishida	Japan	1:31:11
14	Jordi Madera	Spain	1:31:12
15	Heinz Frei	Switzerland	1:31:12
16	Tomoki Suzuki	Japan	1:31:12
17	JohnBoy Smith	United Kingdom	1:33:40
18	Pierre Fairbank	France	1:33:41
19	Patrick Monahan	Ireland	1:33:41
20	Koso Kubo	Japan	1:33:42

=== Wheelchair women ===
Position	Athlete	Nationality	Time
1st place, gold medalist(s)	Manuela Schär	Switzerland	1:39:57
2nd place, silver medalist(s)	Amanda McGrory	United States	1:44:34
3rd place, bronze medalist(s)	Susannah Scaroni	United States	1:47:37
4	Margriet van den Broek	Netherlands	1:49:50
5	Jade Jones	United Kingdom	1:51:46
6	Katrina Gerhard	United States	1:54:34
7	Shirley Reilly	United States	1:54:34
8	Mel Nicholls	United Kingdom	1:59:07
9	Diane Roy	Canada	2:00:05
10	Martyna Snopek	United Kingdom	2:35:40
