= Maidenhead Half Marathon =

Maidenhead Half Marathon 2011 logo

Maidenhead Half Marathon is an annual running race held in Maidenhead, Berkshire, England. The inaugural race took place on Sunday 4 September 2011, starting at 9.30am, and attracted over 2,000 entrants. It was organised by local company Purple Patch Running.

== Past winners ==
Year	Date	Men's winner	Time (h:m:s)	Women's winner	Time (h:m:s)
2011		Charles Coleman	1:12:02	Samantha Amend	1:19:39
2012		Jonathan Stead	1:10:56	Shona McIntosh	1:17:49
2013	8 September	Tim Haughian	1:11:49	Alex Gounelas	1:20:11
2014		Michael Hiscott	1:07:34	Amy Clements	1:20:39
2015	6 September	Peter Thompson	1:10:48	Tracy Barlow	1:17:29
2016	4 September	Matthew Richards	1:12:25	Tracy Barlow	1:15:51
2017	3 September	Paul Molyneux	1:07:55	Helen Davies	1:18:00
2018	2 September	Joe Morwood	1:10:05	Camilla Hermsen	1:22:50
2019	1 September	Rob Corney	1:08:30	Katherine Wood	1:15:28
2020	No Event				
2021 §	5 September	Neil Kevern	1:09:23	Naomi Mitchell	1:16:44

§ Location changed to Dorney Lake for this edition.

== Course ==
Maidenhead Half Marathon has a fast flat course, with an overall elevation change of less than 10 m, and therefore provides excellent PB potential.

=== 2011 ===
The original course took in some of the most attractive local scenery including Bray, Maidenhead Riverside and Cookham. Starting in front of the Town Hall, runners made their way round the town centre before heading out along the A308 towards Windsor. Around the 3-mile (4.8 km) mark the route turned left and headed into Bray Village, then along Oldfield Road and through Guards Club Park to Maidenhead Bridge. Next was a scenic, mile-long stretch alongside the River Thames before runners made their way to Cookham on Ray Mead Road. The route then turned left onto The Causeway, then back towards Maidenhead on Maidenhead Road. Approaching Maidenhead the runners turned left again and followed Cookham Road as far as Kidwells Park. The final part of the route went through the centre of Kidwells Park, under the A4, down the High Street, and looped around Chapel Arches before finishing in front of the Town Hall.

=== 2012 ===
For 2012 the route was altered to two laps of the Maidenhead/Cookham half of the route, staying north of the A4 throughout. Although less picturesque, this reduced congestion at the start and gave spectators a better opportunity to see the action. The amended route was voted in 4th place for PB potential in the Runner's World Races of the Year 2012 Awards.

== Number for life ==
Maidenhead Half Marathon offers an unusual feature in that participants keep their race number for life. A charity auction allows people to bid for desirable numbers, with all proceeds going to a local charity called The Link Foundation. In 2011 this raised over £2,600 and attracted a winning bid of £300 for the number "1".
