= Tracy Barlow (runner) =

British long-distance runner

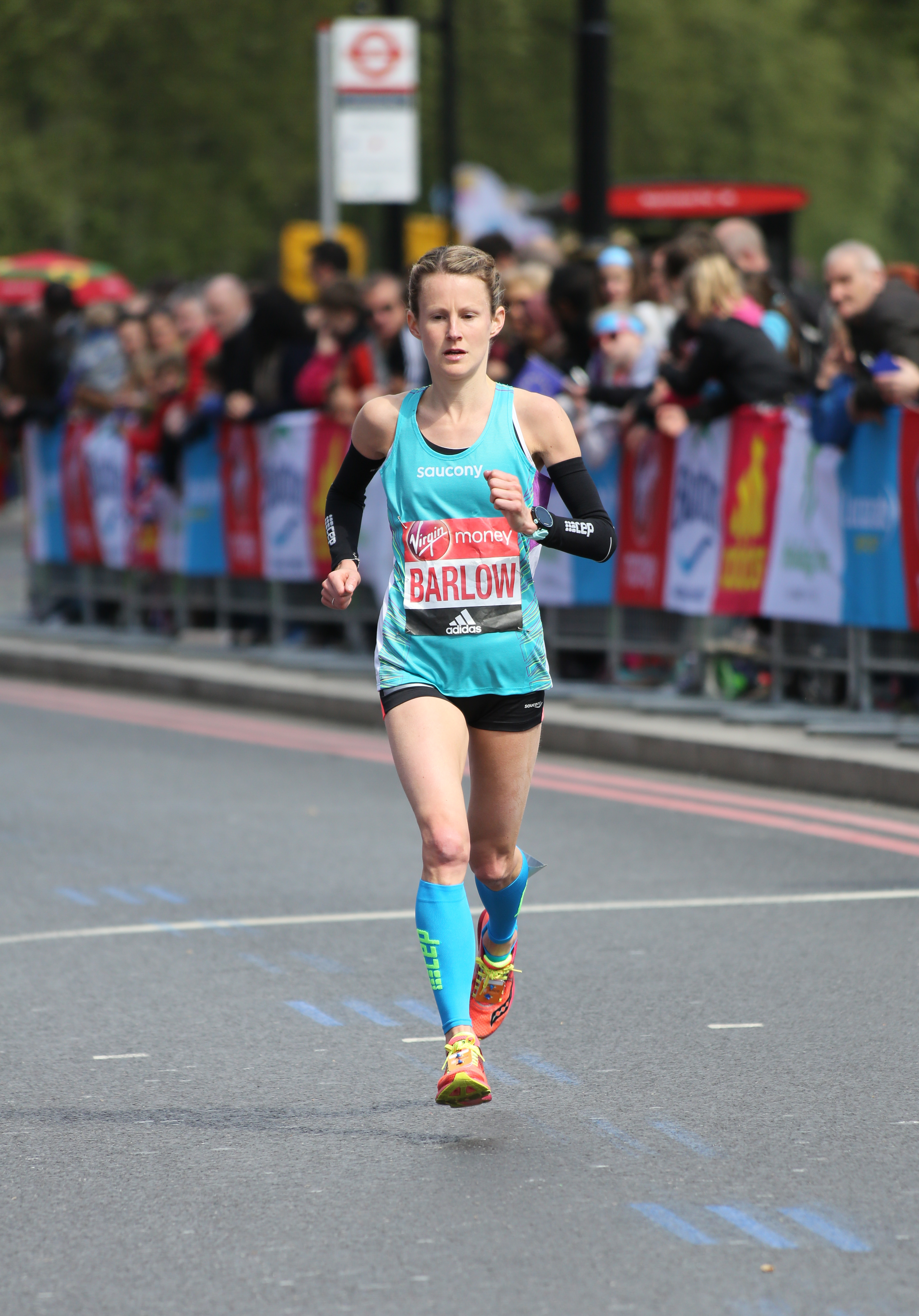
- Barlow at the 2017 London Marathon

Personal information
- Nationality: British
- Born: 18 June 1985 (age 40)

Sport
- Sport: Long-distance running
- Event: Marathon

Tracy Barlow (born 18 June 1985) is a British long distance runner. She has represented Great Britain in the marathon at the 2017 World Championships in Athletics and 2018 European Athletics Championships. Her marathon best of 2:30:42, set in 2017, ranks her in the UK all-time top 25.

Barlow did not have a strong background in track and field in her youth and mainly took part in sprinting events at school. She only began taking part in club distance running competitions with Thames Valley Harriers in 2008 at the age of 23. She entered the Run to the Beat half marathon in 2010 and ranked in the top 400. She completed her first marathon at the 2011 London Marathon, finishing in 3:52:59 hours and placing 1402nd in the mass race. She steadily improved in 2012, running 3:27:18 hours at the 2012 London Marathon then 3:17:45 at the 2012 Amsterdam Marathon.

A sub-three hour clocking at the 2013 London Marathon saw her place in the top 50 women in the mass race. She began working with coach Nick Anderson in order to improve further and she subsequently dropped her best to 2:54:13 hours at the 2014 London Marathon (placing 27th in the women's mass race) and finished 18th at the 2014 Berlin Marathon with a run of 2:51:29.

Barlow worked full-time as a nurse during her early running career, later moving into receptionist and office administration work to enable her to train more effectively. She established herself as an elite level runner in 2015. At the 2015 London Marathon she ran 2:39:56 to place fourth in the mass race (and 22nd among all women). She then knocked a minute off her best at the Toronto Waterfront Marathon with a run of 2:38:49 for 13th place. A stand-out performance of 2:33:20 to win the women's mass race at the 2016 London Marathon meant she was four minutes clear of any other woman in the mass race, and faster than Olympians Freya Ross and René Kalmer had run in the elite race.

She reduced her office work to part-time in January 2017 before turning fully professional as a runner at age 31 in March. The change proved successful as she placed 16th in the elite race of the 2017 London Marathon, setting a personal best of 2:30:42 and gaining selection for the 2017 World Championships in Athletics as Britain's third fastest woman (behind Charlotte Purdue and Alyson Dixon). At the World Championships race held in London, she finished 43rd in her international debut. The following year she placed ninth at the 2018 London Marathon and represented Great Britain at the 2018 European Athletics Championships, taking 15th place in a time of 2:35:00 and leading the British women to fourth in the team competition. She fell down the rankings at the 2019 London Marathon, running 2:36:26 for 19th place (fourth fastest Briton).

== Marathon record ==
Year	Competition	Venue	Position	Notes
Representing Great Britain
2011	London Marathon	London, United Kingdom	1402nd	3:52:59^
2012	London Marathon	London, United Kingdom	571st	3:27:18^
2012	Amsterdam Marathon	Amsterdam, Netherlands	54th	3:17:45^
2013	London Marathon	London, United Kingdom	68th	2:59:53^
2014	London Marathon	London, United Kingdom	41st	2:54:13^
2014	Berlin Marathon	Berlin, Germany	18th	2:51:29
2015	London Marathon	London, United Kingdom	24th	2:40:02
2015	Toronto Waterfront Marathon	Toronto, Canada	13th	2:38:51
2016	London Marathon	London, United Kingdom	17th	2:33:20
2016	Frankfurt Marathon	Frankfurt, Germany	9th	2:32:05
2017	London Marathon	London, United Kingdom	16th	2:30:42
2017	World Championships	London, United Kingdom	43rd	2:41:03
2018	London Marathon	London, United Kingdom	9th	2:32:09
2018	European Championships	Berlin, Germany	15th	2:35:00
2019	London Marathon	London, United Kingdom	19th	2:36:26
2020	London Marathon	London, United Kingdom	15th	2:34:42
2023	Amsterdam Marathon	Amsterdam, Netherlands	21st	2:39:02
2024	Frankfurt Marathon	Frankfurt, Germany	16th	2:35:57

^ Chip time
