= Casey Wood =

Australian long-distance runner

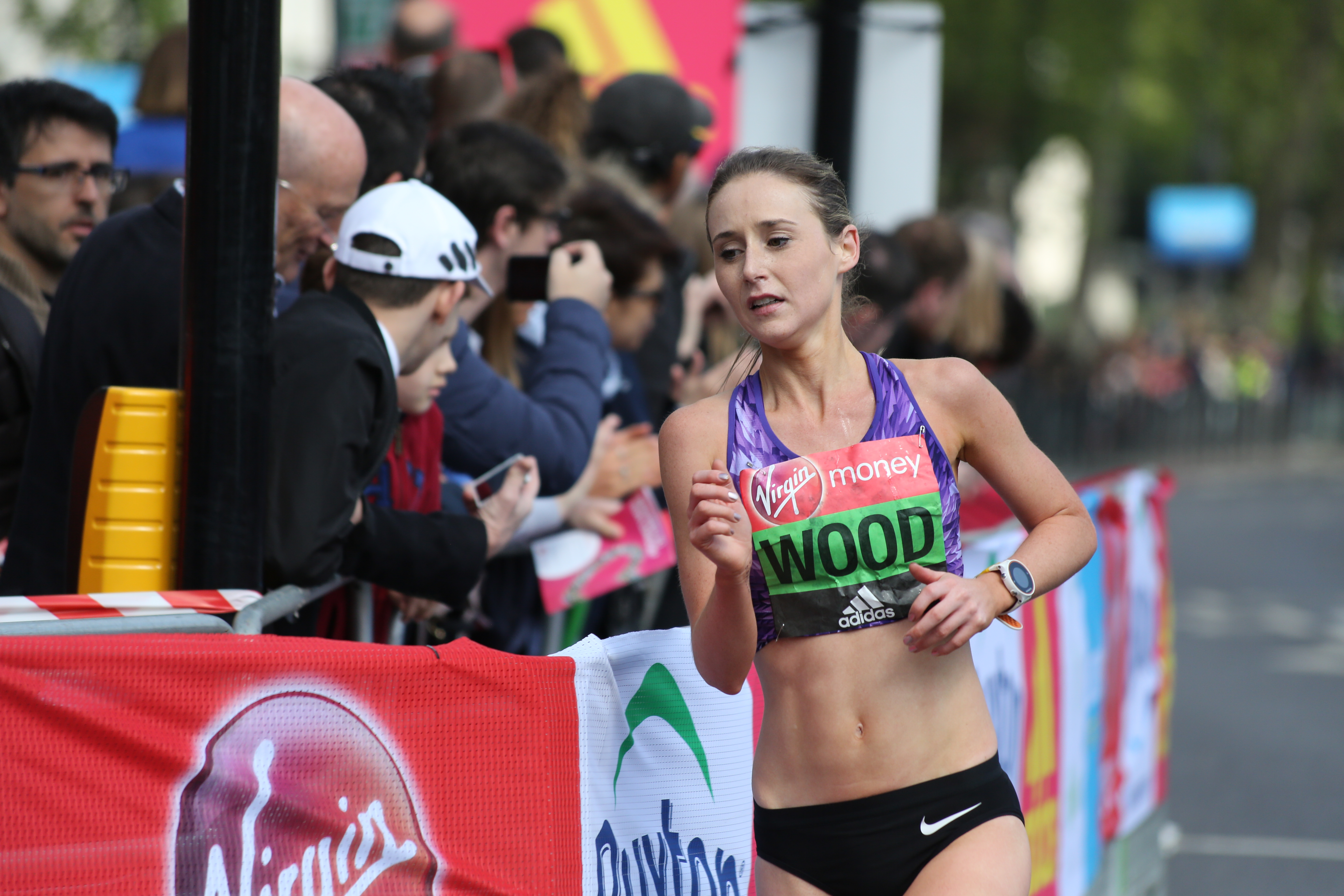
Casey Wood at the 2017 London Marathon

Casey Wood (born 24 February 1989) is an Australian long-distance runner.

In 2014, she won the Sydney City2Surf in a time of 47 minutes and 59 seconds. In 2013, she won the "Sydney 10" race.
