= Brighton Marathon =

Annual event in Brighton, England

Coordinates: 50.8192°N 0.1333°W

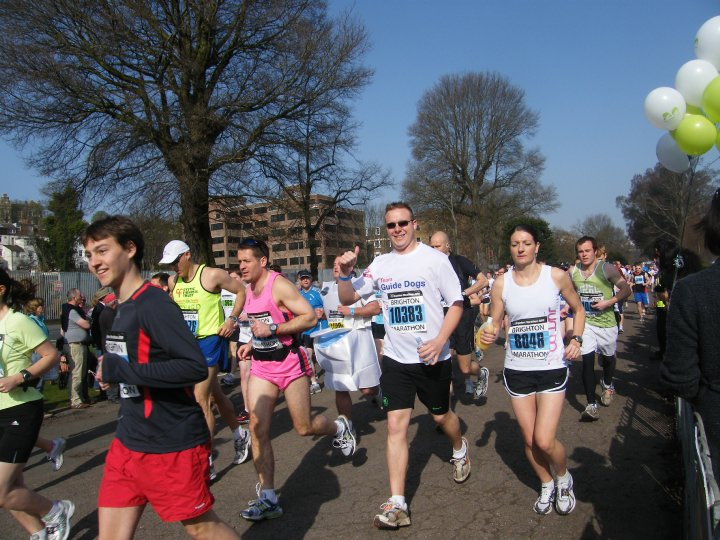
- Runners during the first Brighton Marathon in 2010
- Location: Brighton and Hove, United Kingdom
- Event type: Road
- Distance: Marathon
- Established: 2010; 16 years ago
- Course records: Men: 2:09:25 (William Chebor, 2014); Women: 2:28:50 (Eunice Kales, 2013)
- Website: Brightonmarathonweekend.co.uk

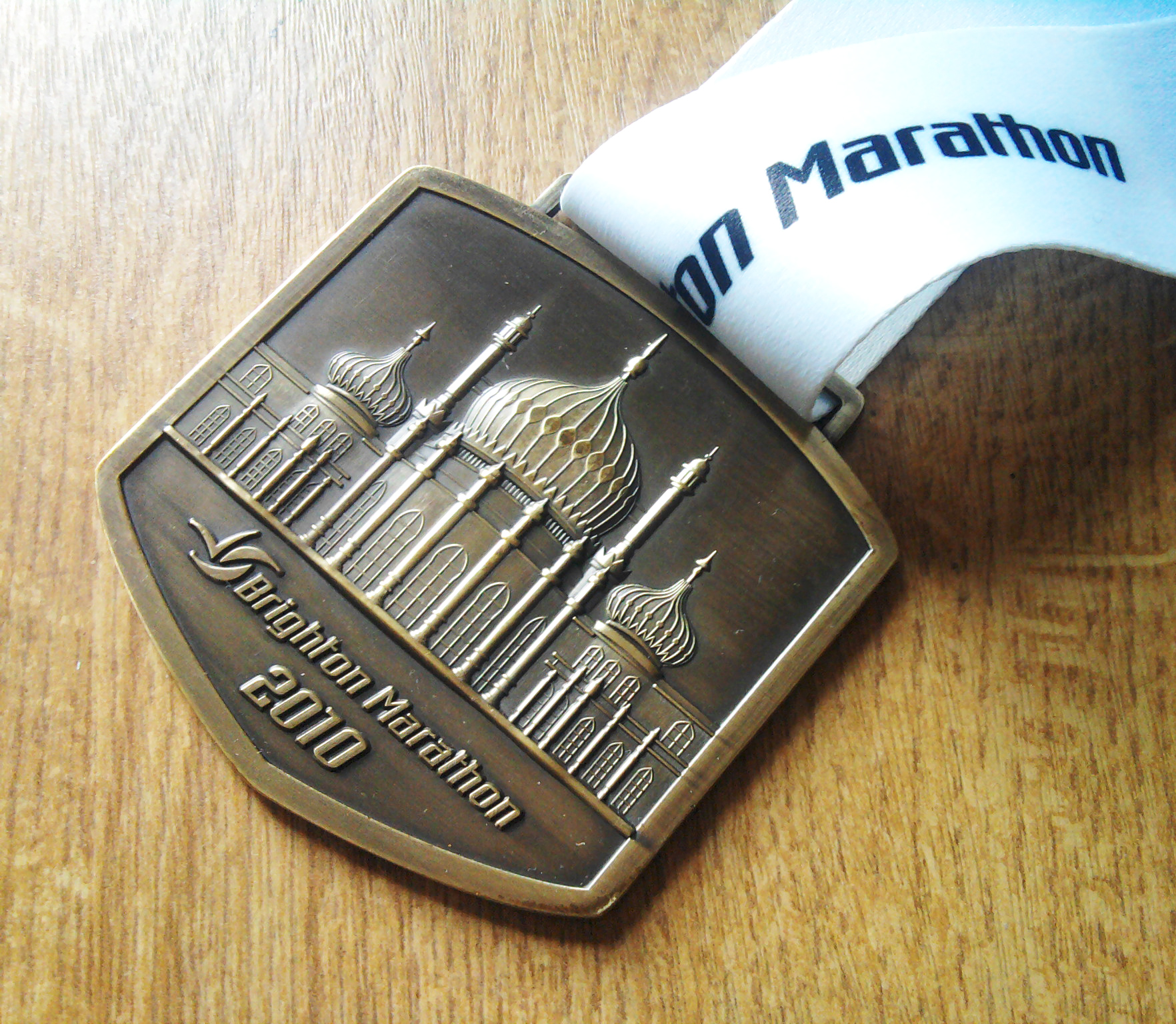
Inaugural finisher's medal, 2010

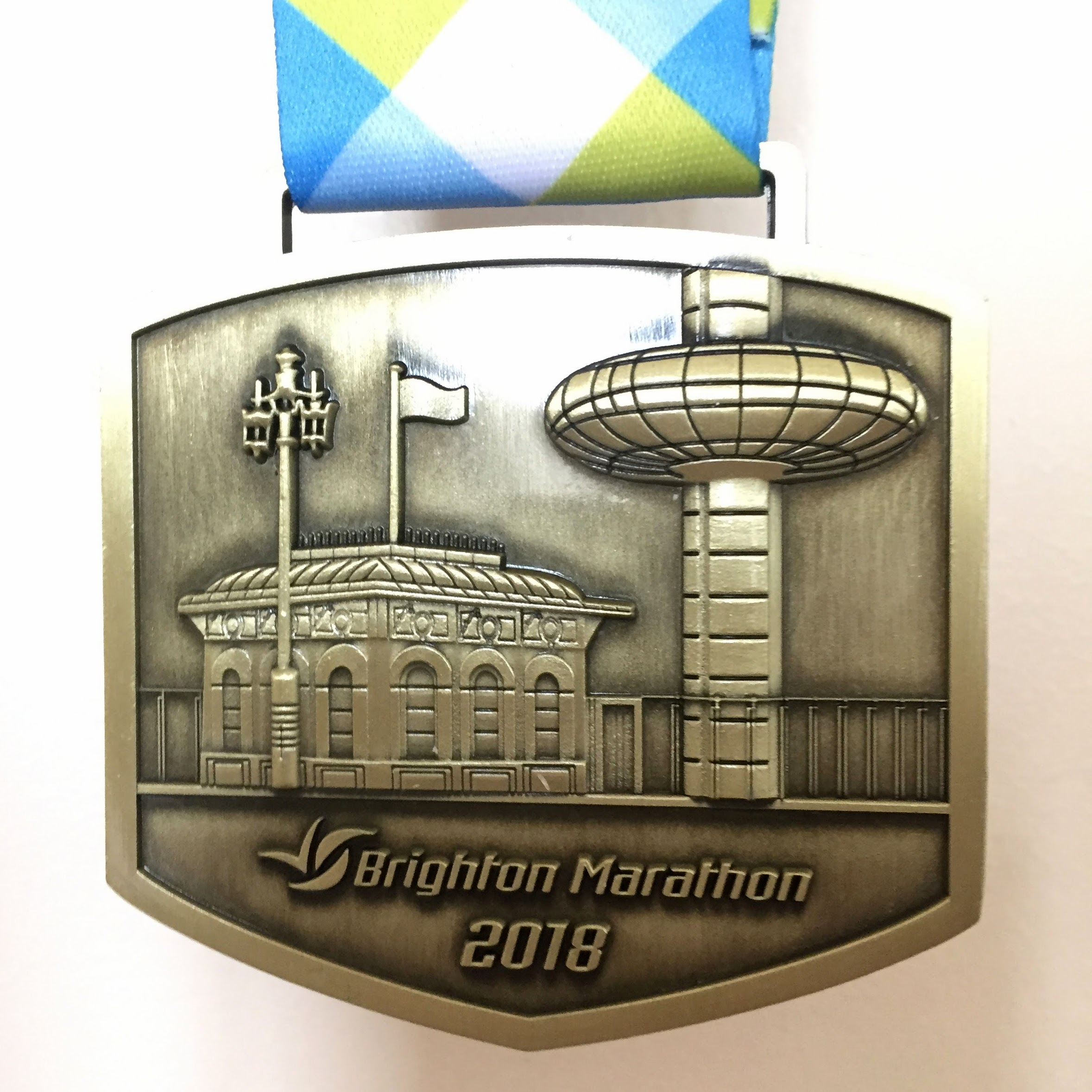
Finisher's medal from 2018

The Brighton Marathon is an annual marathon in Brighton and Hove, England. It was first held on 18 April 2010 and has usually been held in April every year since. The inaugural Brighton Marathon was set up by former international athlete Tim Hutchings and local athlete Tom Naylor.

== History ==
The first Brighton Marathon took place on 18 April 2010. The race opened to 12,000 entries, with 7,589 participating on race day. The course start line was at Preston Park. The route took in some of the sights of central Brighton before heading East towards Rottingdean. The race then headed west out to and around Hove, before returning on the seafront and finishing on Madeira Drive, close to Brighton Pier.

In Year 2 (April 2011), over 8,000 runners took part with spectator numbers estimated at around 120,000. The race has acquired the status of "Britain's No. 2 marathon", after the London Marathon, for its profile in the national running arena, for its standard of race organisation and for the publicity generated by the event. More than two hundred charities had runners in the 2011 event and this demand has led to an increase from 3,000 to 5,000 in the number of places being offered to charities in 2012.

The 2012 event saw a 20% increase on entries to an acceptance of 18,000, putting it in the top 12 running events in the UK. In September 2011, The Brighton Marathon was granted coveted Bronze Medal status by the World governing body, the International Association of Athletics Federations (IAAF).

The 2020 in-person edition of the race was cancelled due to the coronavirus pandemic. (Note: It had initially been postponed to 20 September 2020, and then converted into a 10K run (Note: The race was intended to complement a distance of 20 miles (32 km), completed virtually by the runner prior to the event, in order to sum up to the marathon distance.) to be held on 11 October 2020, before being cancelled.)

Similarly, the 2021 edition of the race, originally scheduled for April, was postponed to 12 September due to the pandemic, with many registrants given the option of transferring their entry to 2022 or obtaining a full refund.

In September 2022, event organisers Grounded Events Company Limited was criticised by a number of podium finishers of the marathon over not being paid their prize money.

In November 2022, Grounded Events filed for administration, with the company being about £1.2million in debt. FRP was appointed as administrator. The company was bought by London Marathon Events (LME) the next month, with Brighton & Hove City Council granting a five year licence to operate the event until at least 2027. The 2023 edition of the race went ahead as planned, with the event being added to LME's portfolio of events which also includes the London Marathon, Ride London and Swim Serpentine.

== Results ==
The first men's elite race in 2010 was won by Mongolian runner Bat-Ochiryn Ser-Od with a time of 2:19:05. Between 2011 and 2014, the men's elite race course record was broken consecutively by Kenyans Philemon Boit, Peter Kimeli Some, Dominic Kangor and William Chebor. In 2014, Chebor set the current record with a time of 2:09:25. Kenyan Duncan Maiyo is the most successful athlete with back-to-back wins in 2015 and 2016. In both races, he was less than a minute over the course record. In 2017, Stuart Hawkes became the first English winner and first European winner in the men's elite race with a time of 2:27:36.

The first women's elite race, also in 2010, was won by Briton Joanna Bryce in 3:05:20. The course record was broken for three consecutive years by Alyson Dixon, Sviatlana Kouhan and Eunice Kales. Kouhan became the first non-British winner with a time of 2:41:22 in 2012, and Kales became the first non-European winner in 2013 with a time of 2:28:50 – the current course record. Alice Milgo, Pennina Wanjiru and Grace Momanyi all continued the success for Kenya in the following years, while Lishan Dula became the first Asian athlete to finish in the top three with her second-place finish in 2015. Helen Davies became the first Briton to win in six years with a time of 2:42:40 in 2017, and he retained the win in 2018 with an improved time of 2:38:41.

== Elite race winners ==
=== Men ===
Year	Winner			Runner-Up			Third Place			Notes
2010	Bat-Ochiryn Ser-Od	Mongolia	2:19:05	Michael Coleman	United Kingdom	2:24:38	Christopher Thomson	United Kingdom	2:29:54	Course record
2011	Philemon Boit	Kenya	2:16:07	Richard Rotich	Kenya	2:16:32	Anbessy Tolossa	Ethiopia	2:16:54	Course record
2012	Peter Kimeli Some	Kenya	2:12:03	Dominic Pius Ondoro	Kenya	2:12:10	John Kelai	Kenya	2:12:44	Course record
2013	Dominic Kangor	Kenya	2:10:46	Bernard Rotich	Kenya	2:10:51	Robert Mwangi	Kenya	2:11:26	Course record
2014	William Chebor	Kenya	2:09:25	Dominic Kangor	Kenya	2:09:36	Wilfred Murgor	Kenya	2:12:17	Course record
2015	Duncan Maiyo	Kenya	2:10:15	Dominic Kangor	Kenya	2:11:52	Mutai Kipkemei	Kenya	2:14:41	
2016	Duncan Maiyo	Kenya	2:09:51	Raymond Chemungor	Kenya	2:10:50	Edwin Kiptoo	Kenya	2:11:23	
2017	Stuart Hawkes	United Kingdom	2:27:36	Ollie Garrod	United Kingdom	2:31:32	Jon Pepper	United Kingdom	2:31:56	
2018	Stuart Hawkes	United Kingdom	2:22:33	Dan Nash	United Kingdom	2:22:55	Kevin Rojas	United Kingdom	2:23:54	
2019	Peter Le Grice	United Kingdom	2:16:23	Paul Navesey	United Kingdom	2:18:17	Ian Leitch	United Kingdom	2:18:34	
2020	cancelled due to coronavirus pandemic									
2021	Neil McClements	United Kingdom	2:33:45	Ollie Garrod	United Kingdom	2:34:02	Mark Innocenti	United Kingdom	2:35:49	Course 568m too long.
2022	Alix Ramsier	United Kingdom	2:29:08	Ben Holmes	United Kingdom	2:29:26	Will Green	United Kingdom	2:30:02	
2023	Marshall Smith	United Kingdom	2:24:07	Barney Reed	United Kingdom	2:36:16	Axel Finke	Germany	2:36:44	
2024	Oliver Knowles	United Kingdom	2:32:27	Matthew Alderson	United Kingdom	2:32:45	James Cook	United Kingdom	2:36:19	
2025	Sam Cook	United Kingdom	2:26:47	Thomas Blunt	United Kingdom	2:34:04	Hugh Porter	United Kingdom	2:35:07	
2026	Sam Cook	United Kingdom	2:25:04	Ryan Deakin	United Kingdom	2:29:48	Aaron Hudson	United Kingdom	2:31:59	

=== Women ===
Year	Winner			Runner-Up			Third Place			Notes
2010	Joanna Bryce	United Kingdom	3:05:20	Cathy Ulliott	United Kingdom	3:05:42	Louisa Ruderman	United Kingdom	3:13:50	Course record
2011	Alyson Dixon	United Kingdom	2:34:51	Lucy MacAlister	United Kingdom	2:40:35	Julie Briscoe	United Kingdom	2:41:09	Course record
2012	Sviatlana Kouhan	Belarus	2:29:37	Irene Chepkirui	Kenya	2:33:55	Holly Rush	United Kingdom	2:41:22	Course record
2013	Eunice Kales	Kenya	2:28:50	Alyson Dixon	United Kingdom	2:31:10	Frashiah Waithaka	Kenya	2:33:31	Course record
2014	Alice Milgo	Kenya	2:35:33	Selam Abere	Ethiopia	2:36:37	Rebecca Robinson	United Kingdom	2:37:41	
2015	Pennina Wanjiru	Kenya	2:34:25	Lishan Dula	Bahrain	2:34:55	Eunice Kales	Kenya	2:53:50	
2016	Grace Momanyi	Kenya	2:34:11	Asnakech Mengistu	Ethiopia	2:35:37	Pennina Wanjiru	Kenya	2:43:32	
2017	Helen Davies	United Kingdom	2:42:40	Hayley Munn	United Kingdom	2:46:00	Helen Buller	United Kingdom	2:51:22	
2018	Helen Davies	United Kingdom	2:38:41	Sarah Webster	United Kingdom	2:49:02	Sara Bird	United Kingdom	2:52:21	
2019	Helen Davies	United Kingdom	2:34:08	Jill Collett	United Kingdom	2:48:16	Johanna O'Regan	United Kingdom	2:49:41	
2020	cancelled due to coronavirus pandemic									
2021	Verity Hopkins	United Kingdom	2:52:12	Amy Harris	United Kingdom	3:04:28	Lauren Reid	Canada	3:09:32	Course 568m too long.
2022	Melissah Gibson	Australia	2:51:07	Ania Gabb	United Kingdom	2:52:44	Sarah Hanley	United Kingdom	2:56:01	
2023	Helen Reid	United Kingdom	2:55:11	Lucy Barnes	United Kingdom	2:56:10	Fay Hughes	United Kingdom	2:56:42	
2024	Hannah McGowan-Jones	United Kingdom	2:54:43	Victoria Cartmell	United Kingdom	3:03:55	Annie Soper	United Kingdom	3:04:59	
2025	Helen Reid	United Kingdom	2:52:58	Flaminia Gold	United Kingdom	2:54:44	Emily Marchant	United Kingdom	2:55:41	
2026	Amy Harris	United Kingdom	2:49:38	Flaminia Gold	United Kingdom	2:51:42	Lucy Lavender	United Kingdom	2:53:56	

== Incidents ==
23-year-old Sam Harper Brighouse died during the 2013 race after collapsing in Grand Avenue and being taken to hospital. The inquest ruled he died of bowel ischemia and a gastro-intestinal haemorrhage, brought on by an idiosyncratic reaction to hyperthermia, dehydration, endurance exertion, hyperosmolar sports supplements and ibuprofen. The coroner stated Harper Brighouse's preparations for the race were appropriate.

An error in setup led to the 2021 course being 568m too long, which affected the final result of the men's race when winner Neil McClements overtook Ollie Garrod, who had led the whole way, in the last 100m of the course.
