= Josh Griffiths (runner) =

Welsh marathon runner

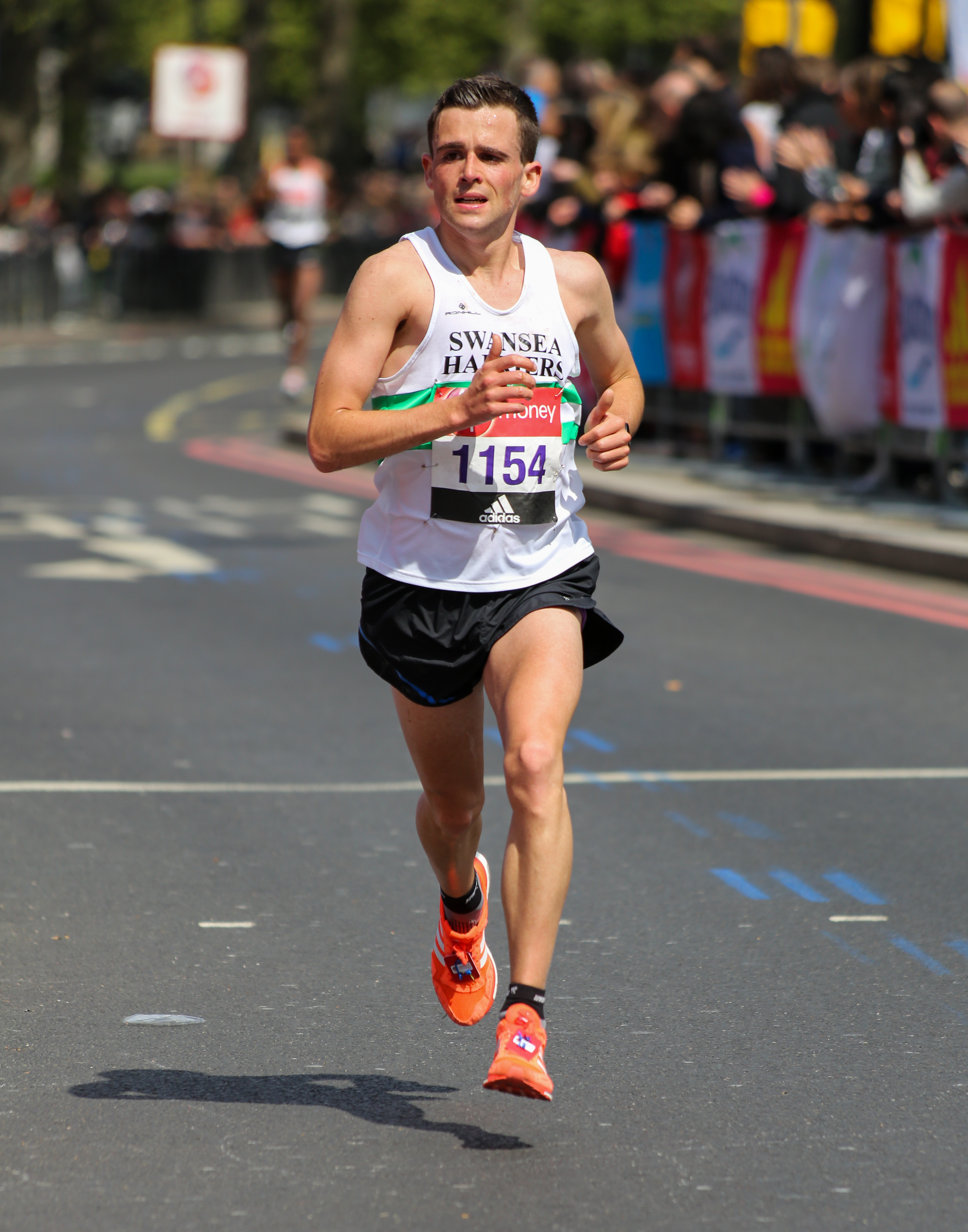
- Josh Griffiths at the 2017 London Marathon

Personal information
- National team: Great Britain
- Born: 3 November 1993 (age 33)
- Education: Cardiff Metropolitan University
- Occupation: Athlete / Coach

Sport
- Country: United Kingdom
- Sport: Athletics
- Events: Marathon, Half Marathon, 10KM
- Club: Swansea Harriers
- Coached by: Self Coached

Achievements and titles
- Personal bests: Marathon: 2:11:28 (2022), 10KM: 28:41 (2019)
- Updated on 12 Dec 2019

Josh Griffiths (born 3 November 1993) is a Welsh marathon runner. He finished 13th at the 2017 London Marathon, and was the first Briton to finish, in a time of 2:14:49. His unexpected performance earned him a place at the 2017 World Championships.

== Running career ==
Griffiths's debut marathon was at the London Marathon on 23 April 2017. Representing his club, Swansea Harriers, he started the race alongside other club runners, behind the elite athletes. He finished the race in 2:14:49 in thirteenth place overall, the first of the British runners. His performance gained him qualification to represent Great Britain at the 2017 World Championships in London, and Griffiths completed the race in a time of 2:20.06 to finish in 39th place.

In 2021, Griffiths finished eighth in the London Marathon on 3 October. The following year, he set a marathon personal best of 2:11.28 at the Seville Marathon on 20 February. He competed at the 2022 World Championships in Eugene, where he finished 49th in 2:17:37.

He is a self-coached athlete.

On 19 June 2026, Griffiths was suspended for a doping violation after testing positive for the banned substance benzoylecgonine, a metabolite of cocaine. He disputed the claim and claimed he did not know how the cocaine entered his system, but later accepted the charges.

== Personal life ==
Griffiths, aged 23 at the time of the 2017 London Marathon, lives in his family's home in rural West Wales. He studied at Cardiff Metropolitan University, and graduated with a master's degree in sports coaching in July 2017.
