= Kibrom Weldemicael =

Eritrean long-distance runner

Ghebrezgiabhier Kibrom
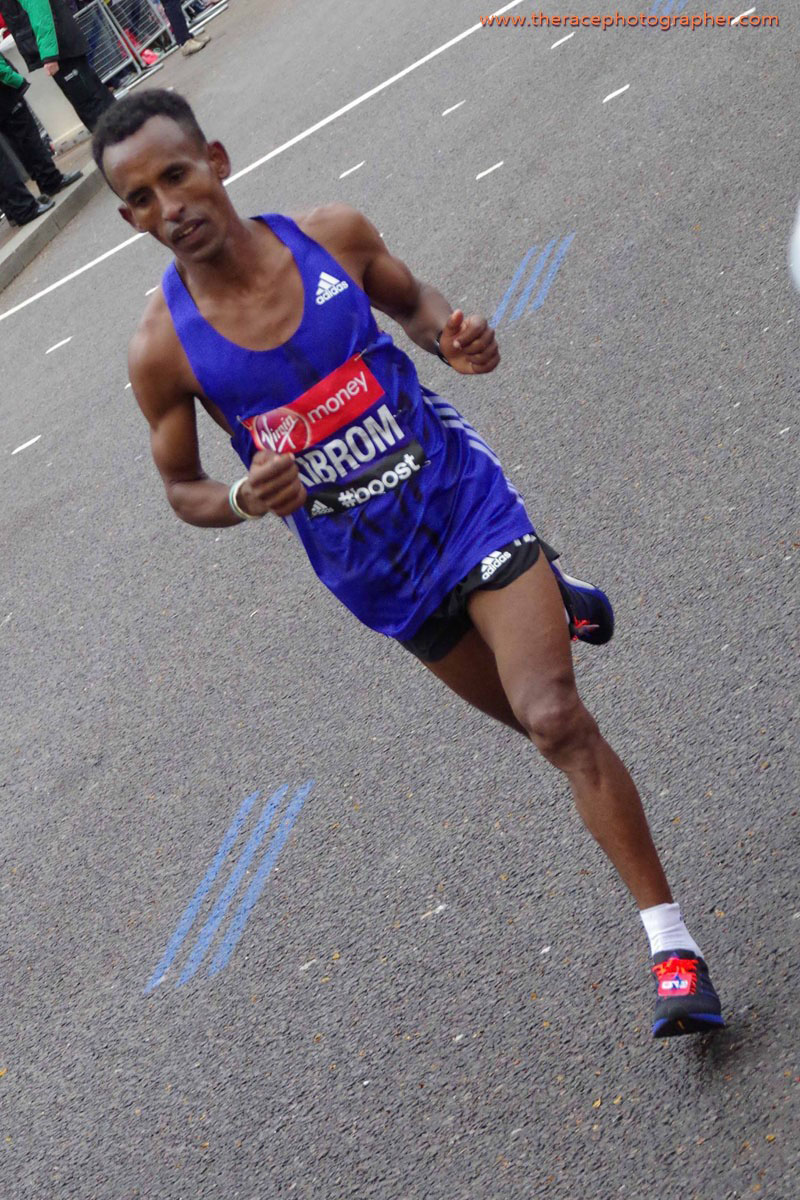

Personal information
- Nationality: Eritrean
- Born: 1 February 1987 (age 38)

Sport
- Sport: Long-distance running
- Event: Marathon

Kibrom Weldemicael (also known as Ghebrezgiabhier Kibrom (born 1 February 1987) is an Eritrean long-distance runner. He came 8th at the 2015 London Marathon and competed in the men's marathon at the 2017 World Championships in Athletics held in London, England. He also competed in the 2016 London Marathon and 2017 London Marathon.

Weldemicael was due to take part in the Paris 2024 Olympics marathon held on 10 August 2024, however the day before he was provisionally suspended for testing positive for EPO and furosemide at the Geneva marathon and left the Olympic village. In December 2024, the anti-doping violation was confirmed by the Athletics Integrity Unit and Weldemicael was issued with a six-year ban based on aggravating circumstances.
