= Helen Davies (runner) =

British long-distance runner

Personal information
- Nationality: British
- Born: Helen Decker; 12 September 1979 (age 46) Ipswich, England
- Height: 1.57 m (5 ft 2 in)
- Weight: 49 kg (108 lb)

Sport
- Events: Marathon, Half marathon Ultra Marathon
- Club: Ipswich Jaffa RC

Helen Davies (née Martin, previously Decker, born 12 September 1979) is a British long-distance runner. She finished 3rd British Lady at the London Marathon in 2010. She competed for Britain at the 2010 European Athletics Championships and represented England at the 2010 Commonwealth Games, both in the marathon.After a 5-year break from running in 2012 to start a family, she returned successfully in 2017 to win the Brighton Marathon, and then went on to win at Brighton Marathon for a furthermore two years, earning selection for a third time to run for Team England at the Toronto Waterfront Marathon in Canada in 2018. Cumulating in a hat trick of wins and pb performance in 2019 at Brighton Marathon. Following this performance She was selected for Team GB to represent at the IAU 50k World Championships in Brasov Romania. Here she finished second 2mins behind teammate Alyson Dixon, earning herself a world silver medal and helping the team to Gold.

Davies had represented her country during the 2008, 2009 & 2018 Toronto Waterfront Marathon which included an international team challenge.

Davies came to prominence as a marathon runner when she finished in a personal best time of 2:36:56 the 2010 London Marathon. This time won her place in the England squad for 2010 Commonwealth Games. She was selected for the British team to run at the 2010 European Athletics Championships, she was the fourth British runner to finish behind Michelle Ross-Cope, Susan Partridge and Holly Rush, a race that saw the British team come third in the European Marathon Cup. In the 2010 Commonwealth Games Davies finished eighth in a time of 2:49:24, three minutes behind Ross-Cope who finished sixth.

Both in 2011 and 2012 Davies improved on her London Marathon time taking her personal best to 2:34:11, but a time just short of the required 2:31:00 for a place at the 2012 Summer Olympics.

Davies further improved her Marathon pb 2 years after her return to competition and becoming a mother of two. At her hat trick performance at the Brighton Marathon in 2019. Where she ran 2.34.06.

Davies finished second in the IAU 50 km World Championships in 2019 in a time of 3:09:16.

== Competition Record ==
Year	Competition	Venue	Position	Event	Notes
Representing Great Britain and England
2009	London Marathon	London, England	5th	Marathon	2:42:08
2010	London Marathon	London, England	16th	Marathon	2:36:56
2010	European Athletics Championships	Barcelona, Spain	18th	Marathon	2:43:00
2010	Commonwealth Games	Delhi, India	8th	Marathon	2:49:24
2011	London Marathon	London, England	24th	Marathon	2:35:43
2012	London Marathon	London, England	20th	Marathon	2:34:11 (PB)
2017	Brighton Marathon	Brighton, England	1st	Marathon	2:42:40
2017	Maidenhead Half Marathon	Maidenhead, England	1st	Half Marathon	1:18:00
2018	Brighton Marathon	Brighton, England	1st	Marathon	2:38:41
2019	Brighton Marathon	Brighton, England	1st	Marathon	2:34:08
