= Sean Hehir =

Irish long-distance runner

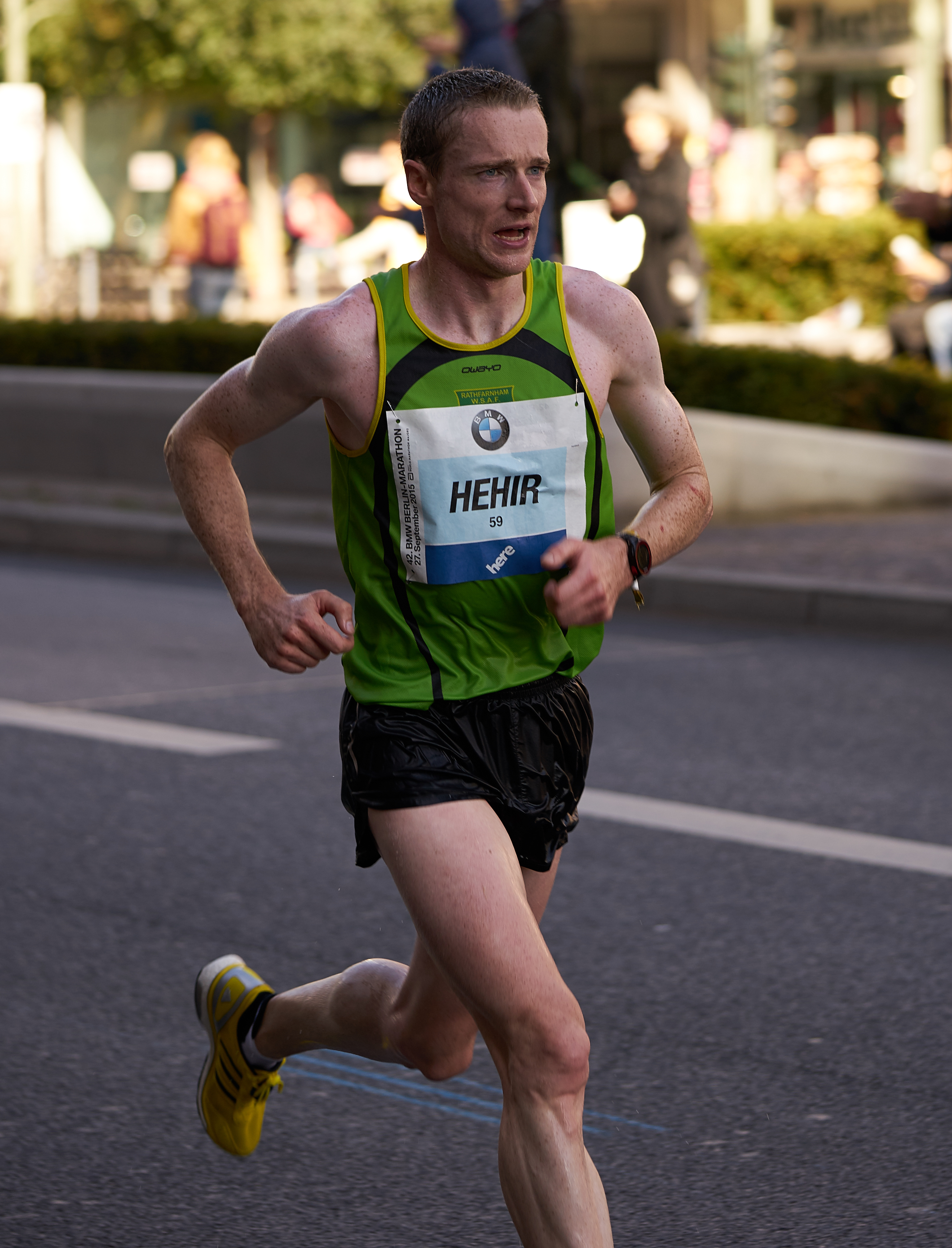
Hehir in Berlin 2015

Sean Hehir (born 27 January 1985) is an Irish long-distance runner from Kilkishen in County Clare. He is a primary school teacher by profession, having attended Froebel College of Education and Trinity College Dublin.

== Career ==
Hehir won the 2013 Dublin Marathon. In the 2015 race, he was crowned the Irish national marathon champion for the second time after being the top Irish finisher of the race, four weeks after having competed in the Berlin Marathon where he finished in a time of 2:17.48. He won the 2016 Irish Inter-County Cross Country Championships in Tuam, County Galway. He was the Irish national half marathon champion in 2011 and the Irish Intermediate Cross Country champion in 2009. Hehir ran 2:16.18 at the 2017 London Marathon and subsequently represented Ireland in the marathon at the 2017 IAAF World Athletics Championships in London. He also represented Ireland at the 2014 European Athletics Championships in Zürich, Switzerland where he finished in 20th position in a time of 2:17.5
