= Alyson Dixon =

English long-distance-runner

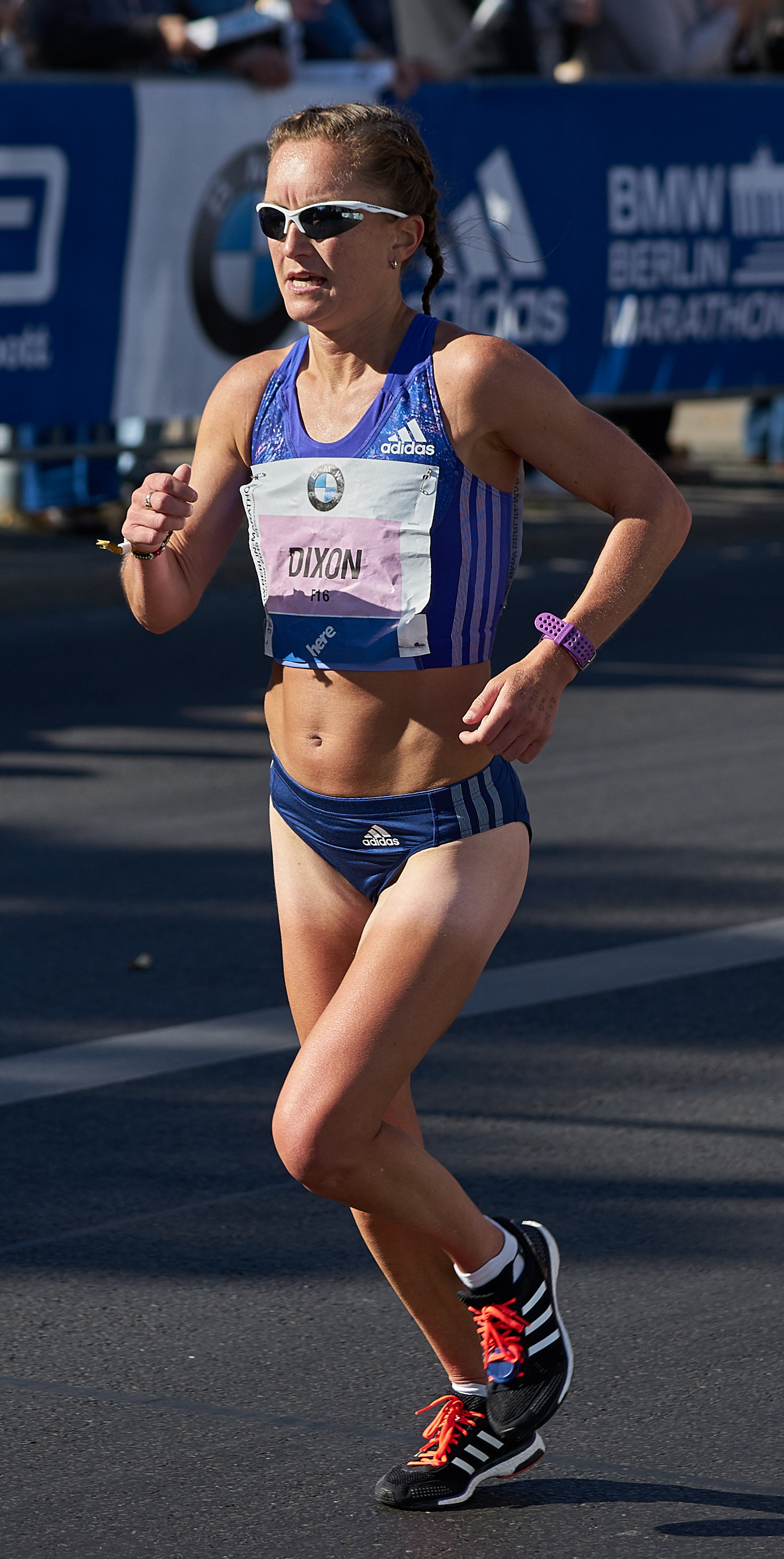
- Alyson Dixon competing at the 2015 Berlin Marathon

Personal information
- Nickname: Aly
- National team: Team GB; England
- Born: 24 September 1978 (age 47) Sunderland, England
- Height: 153 cm (5 ft 0 in)
- Weight: 42 kg (93 lb)
- Website: alydixon.com

Sport
- Sport: Athletics
- Distance: Marathon; Half marathon; 10K
- Club: Strollette at Sunderland Strollers Running Club

Achievements and titles
- Personal bests: 2:29:06 - Marathon; 70:38 - Half marathon; 32:17 - 10K

Alyson Dixon (born 24 September 1978) is an English long-distance runner.

== Athletic career ==
Dixon won the 2011 Brighton Marathon. She competed for England at the 2014 Commonwealth Games, but did not finish due to an Achilles tendon injury. She competed for Great Britain at the 2016 Summer Olympics in Rio de Janeiro, finishing 28th in the women's marathon.

In September 2019 Dixon won the 50 km world championship in Brasov, Romania setting a world record time of 3:07:20. Her record stood until 2021, when it was broken by Des Linden.

== Personal life ==
Dixon is an ambassador for St Benedict's Hospice in Sunderland.

She first joined an athletics club as a girl when a friend did and because she wanted to go to Flamingo Land Resort as the club was going there.

In 2023 and 2024 she finished First woman in the Sunderland half Marathon with times of 1:19:03 and 1:19:15.

She is a qualified UKA coach and currently coaches for New Levels Coaching url=https://www.newlevelscoaching.co.uk/dt_team/aly-dixon/

Her Father David Dixon was a keen marathon runner with a PB of 2.21.24
