= Australian Paralympic Athletics Team =

Athletics events have been held at every Paralympic Games. At the end of the Beijing Games, athletics was Australia's most successful medal sport. Since 2001, Athletics Australia has the responsibility of preparing the Australian athletics team for the Paralympic Games. .

Notable Australian athletes include:

- Neil Fuller, a leg amputee sprinter, has won 15 medals (6 gold, 6 silver and 3 bronze medals)
- Louise Sauvage, a female wheelchair racer, has won 13 medals (9 gold and 4 silver medals)
- Heath Francis, an arm amputee sprinter, has won 13 medals (6 gold, 4 silver and 3 bronze medals)
- Tim Sullivan, a cerebral palsy sprinter has won 10 gold medals.

== Medal table ==
Games	Gold	Silver	Bronze	Total
1960 Rome	0	4	1	5
1964 Tokyo	2	3	0	5
1968 Tel-Aviv	7	7	5	19
1972 Heidelberg	3	4	4	11
1976 Toronto	7	11	5	23
1980 Arnhem	8	9	17	34
1984 Stoke Mandeville	17	19	22	58
1988 Seoul	14	19	20	53
1992 Barcelona	13	15	12	40
1996 Atlanta	19	12	12	43
2000 Sydney*	35	15	16	66
2004 Athens	10	12	10	32
2008 Beijing	10	9	7	26
2012 London	5	9	13	27
2016 Rio	3	9	14	26
2020 Tokyo	4	7	8	19
2024 Paris	3	2	6	11
Totals (17 entries)	160	166	172	498

Rank based on gold medal count.

== Summer Paralympic Games ==
=== 1960 ===
Australia represented by:
Men – Frank Ponta WA, Gary Hooper NSW
Women – Daphne Ceeney NSW

=== 1964 ===
Australia represented by:
Men – Gary Hooper
Women – Daphne Ceeney, Marion O'Brien, Elaine Schreiber

=== 1968 ===
Australia represented by:
Men – Peter Burt, Brian Chambers, Kevin Coombs, Kevin Cunningham, Gary Hooper, John Martin, Bill Mather-Brown, Robert McIntyre, Allan McLucas, Bruno Moretti, Kevin Munro, Frank Ponta, Vic Renalson, Noel Simmons
Women – Lorraine Dodd, Daphne Hilton, Cherrie Loydstrom, Marion O'Brien, Elaine Schreiber, Pam Smith, Di Workman

=== 1972 ===
Australia represented by:
Men – Ray Barrett, Brian Chambers, Kevin Coombs, Frank Ponta, Terry Giddy, Don Kay, John Martin, Terry Mason, Robert McIntyre, Bob Macmillam, Hugh Patterson, Vic Renalson, Cliff Rickard, Victor Salvemini
Women – Tracey Freeman, Cherrie Ireland, Elizabeth Richards, Elaine Schreiber, Pam Smith
Australia 11 medals – three gold, four silver and four bronze medals.

=== 1976 ===
Australia represented by:
Men – Robert Faulkner, Wayne Flood, Paul Gianni, Don Kay, John Kestel, John Kidd, Stan Kosmala, Peter Marsh, John Martin, Terry Mason, Robert McIntyre, Jeff McNeill, Jago Mikulic, Harry Moseby, Richard Oliver, Wayne Patchett, Frank Ponta, Vic Renalson, Doug Rupe, Eric Russell Ross Soutar, Murray Todd
Women – Tracey Freeman, Elaine Schreiber
Australia won 23 medals – 7 gold, 11 silver and 5 bronze medals.

=== 1980 ===
Australia represented by:
Men – Rene Ahrens, Chris Alp, ? Andres, Paul Bird, Kevin Bishop, Donald Dann, Joe Egan, Robert Faulkner, Peter Hill, Erich Hubel, Barry Kalms, Wayne Lanham, Peter Marsh, John Martin, Michael McFawn, Robert McIntyre, Jeff McNeill, Brian McNicholl, David McPherson, Kevin Munro, Mike Nugent, Richard Oliver, Wayne Patchett, Fred Pointer, Eric Russell, Bruce Sandilands, John Sheil, Murray Todd, Ian Trewhella, Robert Turner
Women – Charmaine Cree, Sue Hobbs, ? Langhorne, Pam Nugent, Julie Russell, J. Wilson
Athletics was Australia's most successful team winning 34 medals – 8 gold, 9 silver and 17 bronze medals.

=== 1984 ===
Australia represented by:
Men – Terry Biggs, Paul Bird, K. Bley, Murray Buck, Bailey Compton, Paul Croft, Donald Dann, Mark Davies, Michael Desanto, Neil Dixon, Alan Dufty, Joe Egan, David Evans, Vernon Ezzy, John Federico, Ian Gainey, Terry Giddy, Nicky Gleeson, David Goodman, James Hoggan, Brett Holcombe, Peter Kirby, Warren Lawton, Peter Marsh, Kerrod McGregor, Robert McIntyre, Jeff McNeill, David McPherson, Michael Morley, Stephen Muir, Peter Negropontis, Michael Nugent, John Payne, M. Quinn, David Regan, Stephen Sargolia, John Sheil, Darryl Smith, Peter Trotter, Robert Turner, Jeff Wiseman, Garry Woolgar
Women – Lynette Coleman, Julie Dowling, Meredith Jones, Margaret Murphy, Jan Randles, Ira Rankin, Prue-Anne Reynalds, Amanda Rose, Julie Russell, Donna Smith, Catherine Watson, Valerie Woodbridge
Australia won 58 medals – 17 gold, 19 silver and 22 bronze medals.

=== 1988 ===
Australia represented by:
Men –Rene Ahrens, Ian Aitchison, Robert Biancucci, Fabian Blattman, Peter Cliff, Darren Collins, Richard Cordukes, Paul Croft, Mark Davies, Michael Desanto, Phillip Deveraux, Alan Dufty, John Eden, Joe Egan, Craig Elliott, Shane Ellsmore, John Federico, Ian Gainey, Terry Giddy, David Goodman, Michael Hackett, Kevin Hamilton, Gary Hayes, Bradley Hill, Geoffrey Hill, Patrick Hughes, Matthew Jesse, Warren Lawton, John Lindsay, Adrian Lowe, Wayne Maher, Brett McArthur, Kerrod McGregor, Michael McIntyre, Warren McKennairey, Jeff McNeill, Marko Milne, Kieran Modra, Michael Nugent, Rodney Nugent, Andrew O'Sullivan, Nigel Parsons, David Pearson, Malcolm Richards, Sam Rickard, Jaime Romaguera, Edward Roos, Craig Sayers, Ralph Scott, Russell Short, Jason Smart, Thomas Bradley, Darren Thrupp, Ched Towns, Peter Trotter, Robert Turner, Vincenzo Vallelonga, Bruce Wallrodt, Jason Walsh, Ross Whyte, Jason Willis, Jeff Wiseman, Matthew van Eldik
Women – Lynette Coleman, Karen Gill, Meredith Jones, Deahnne McIntyre, Yvette McLellan, Patricia Molseed, Julie Russell, Donna Smith, Katrina Vines
Athletics was Australia's most successful sport at the Games winning 53 medals – 14 gold, 19 silver and 20 bronze medals. 13 athletes won gold medals. Rodney Nugent won 4 gold. Four athletes came home with two gold medals – Adrian Lowe, Nigel Parsons, Russell Short and Bruce Wallrodt.

=== 1992 ===
Australia represented by:
Men – Robert Biancucci, Fabian Blattman, David Bonavita, Brendan Bowden, Allan Butler, Darren Collins, Paul Croft, Mark Davies, Phillip Deveraux, Alan Dufty, John Eden, David Evans, Karl Feifar, Neil Fuller, Terry Giddy, David Goodman, Kyrra Grunnsund, Michael Hackett, Tony Head, Edward Holicky, John Lindsay, Hamish MacDonald, Kerrod McGregor, Kieran Modra, Mike Nugent, Rodney Nugent, Sam Rickard, Jaime Romaguera, Eric Russell, Craig Sayers, Christopher Scott, Russell Short, Greg Smith, Bradley Thomas, Darren Thrupp, Vincenzo Vallelonga, Bruce Wallrodt, Mark Whiteman, Ross Whyte, Paul Wiggins, Jason Willis, Matthew van Eldik
Women – Marsha Green, Yvette McLellan, Alison Quinn, Louise Sauvage, Donna Smith, Karen Smith, Jodi Willis
Coaches – Chris Nunn (amputee), Karen Denman (Cerebral palsy), Jo Hogan (cerebral palsy), Jenny Banks (Wheelchair) Officials – David Reid (Blind Athletics Manager), Trevor Goddard (guide runner), Stuart Miller (guide runner), Rick Grant (personal attendant)

=== 1996 ===
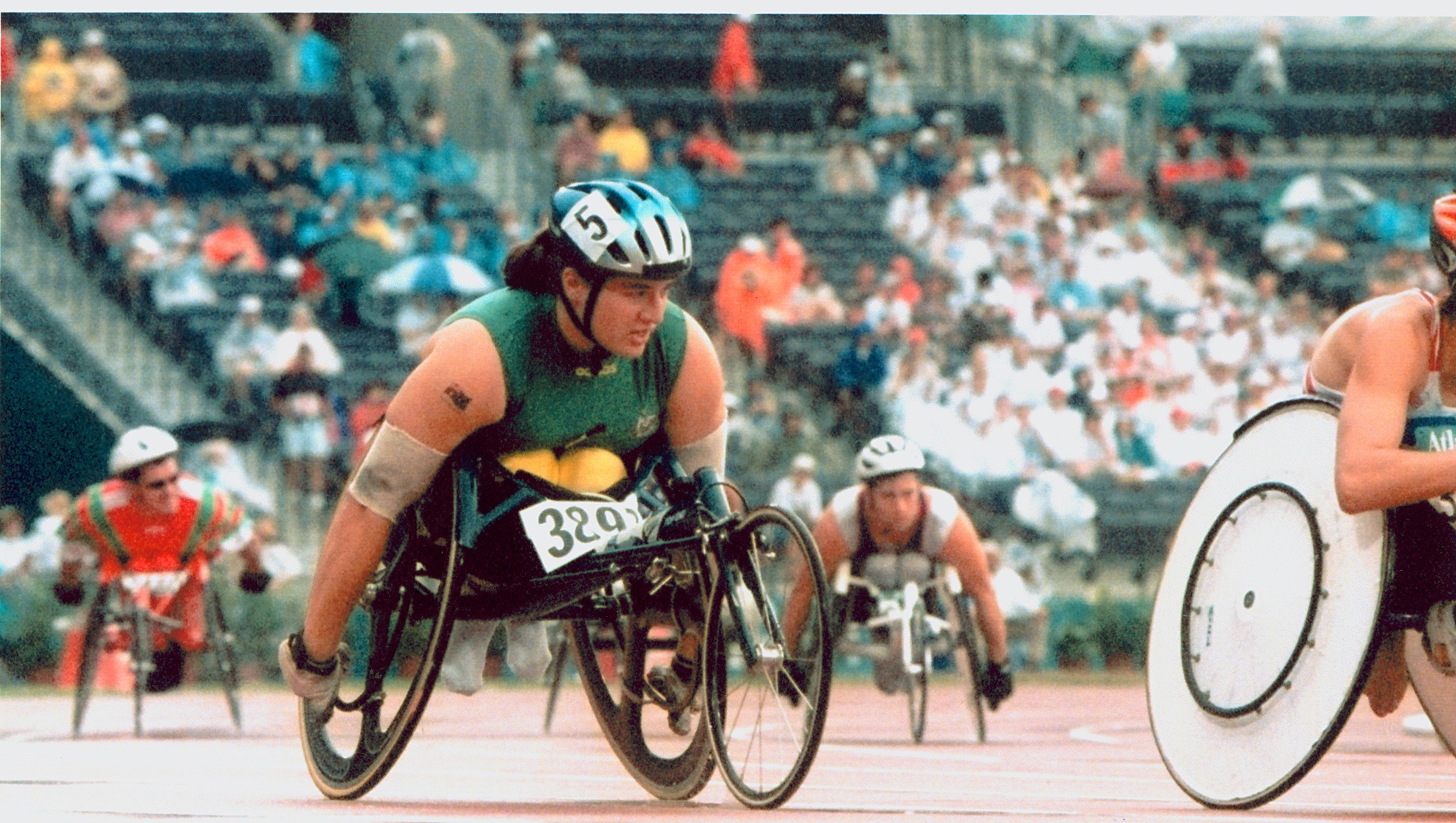
Australian athlete Louise Sauvage races at the 1996 Atlanta Paralympic Games

Australia represented by:
Men – Anthony Biddle, Fabian Blattman, Damien Burroughs, Geoffrey Clarke, Leroi Court, Mark Davies, Michael Dowling, Stephen Eaton, John Eden, Don Elgin, David Evans, Neil Fuller, Terry Giddy, David Goodman, Adrian Grogan, Brian Harvey, Lachlan Jones, John Lindsay, Hamish MacDonald, Tim Matthews, Kerrod McGregor, Paul Nunnari, Sam Rickard, Jaime Romaguera, Russell Short, Greg Smith, Thomas Bradley, Darren Thrupp, Bruce Wallrodt, Paul Wiggins, Matthew van Eldik
Women – Marsha Green, Lisa Llorens, Alison Quinn, Sharon Rackham, Louise Sauvage, Christie Skeleton, Frances Stanley, Leana Viero, Katrina Webb, Jodi Willis-Roberts, Amy Winters
Coaches – Kathryn Lee (Head), Chris Nunn, Lyndall Warry, Andrew Dawes, Scott Goodman

=== 2000 ===
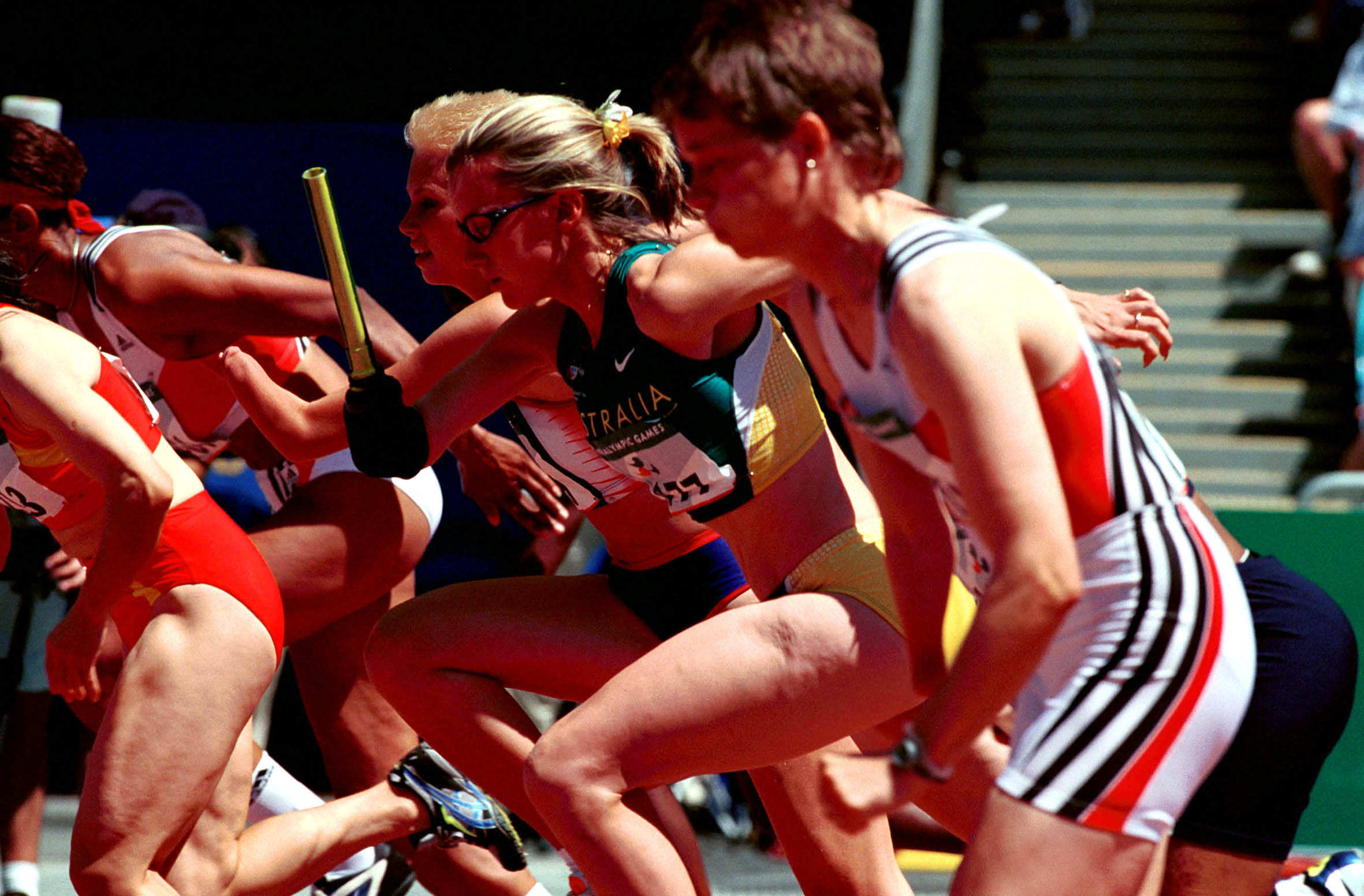
Action shot of Australian athlete Meaghan Starr (shown centre) during track competition at the 2000 Summer Paralympics

Australia represented in athletics by:

Men – Shayne Allen, Kieran Ault-Connell, Wayne Bell, Malcolm Bennett, Anthony Biddle, Russell Billingham, Fabian Blattman, Damien Burroughs, Lee Cox, Roy Daniell, Mark Davies, Michael Dowling, Stephen Eaton, John Eden, Don Elgin, Kurt Fearnley, Anton Flavel, Heath Francis, Neil Fuller, Terry Giddy, Murray Goldfinch, Gerrard Gosens, Adrian Grogan, Brian Harvey, Clayton Johnson, Lachlan Jones, John Lindsay, Hamish MacDonald, John Maclean, Tim Matthews, Jeff McNeill, Paul Mitchell, Andrew Newell, Paul Nunnari, Sam Rickard, Ed Salmon (guide for Gosens), Russell Short, Greg Smith, Tim Sullivan, Darren Thrupp, Geoff Trappett, Steve Thorley (guide for Gosens), Dean Turner, Bruce Wallrodt, Stephen Wilson
Women – Angela Ballard, Joanne Bradshaw, Madelyn Ehlers, Rebecca Feldman, Patricia Flavel, Lynda Holt, Norma Koplick, Tanya Krome, Holly Ladmore, Lisa Llorens, Lisa McIntosh, Alison Quinn, Sharon Rackham, Louise Sauvage, Christie Skeleton, Frances Stanley, Meaghan Starr, Claire Summersgill, Katrina Webb, Debbie Wendt, Jodi Willis, Amy Winters
Coaches – Chris Nunn (Head), Di Barnes, Andrew Dawes, Scott Goodman, Brett Jones, Peter Negropontis, Lorraine Feddema, Robyn Hanson, Phil Badman, Rob Gorringe
Officials – Jason Hellwig (Manager), Hayden Clark, Barb Denson, Petrina Tierney, Jodie Worrall, Allyson Richards, Bill Hunter, Rick Cooke

Australia finished the number one country in athletics with 35 gold, 15 silver and 16 bronze medals. This was Aust

=== 2004 ===
Australia represented in athletics:

Men – Kieran Ault-Connell, Malcolm Bennett, Paul Benz, Damien Burroughs, Richard Colman, Roy Daniell, Don Elgin, Rodney Farr, Kurt Fearnley, Neil Fuller, Benjamin Hall, Brian Harvey, Paul Harpur, Lachlan Jones, Nicholas Larionow, John Lindsay, Hamish MacDonald, Tim Matthews, Richard Nicholson, Paul Nunnari, Federic Periac, Russell Short, Timothy Sullivan, Darren Thrupp, Geoff Trappett, Bruce Wallrodt, Stephen Wilson, Mark Whitman (guide)
Women – Angie Ballard, Joanne Bradshaw, Gemma Buchholz, Christie Dawes, Louise Ellery, Amanda Fraser, Lara Hollow, Julie Iles, Lisa McIntosh, Louise Sauvage, Eliza Stankovic, Katrina Webb, Debbie Wendt, Jodi Willis, Amy Winters
Coaches – Scott Goodman (Head), Paul Angel, Richard Bednall, Andrew Dawes, Iryna Dvoskina, John Eden, Brett Jones, Gary Lees, Alison O'Riordan Officials – Andrew Faichney (Manager), Louise Mogg, Paul Rohwer, Greg Jones, Jodie Carey

Detailed Australian Results

=== 2008 ===
Representing Australia in athletics:
Men – Zac Ashkanasy (Guide runner), Jonathan Bernard, Damien Bowen, Matthew Cameron, Aaron Chatman, Richard Colman, Roy Daniell, Rodney Farr, Kurt Fearnley, Dennis Fitzgerald (Guide runner), Heath Francis, Gerrard Gosens, Courtney Harbeck, Greg Hibberd, Bruce Jones (Guide runner for Gosens), Hamish MacDonald, Wade McMahon, Christopher Mullins, Richard Nicholson, Evan O'Hanlon, Paul Pearce (Guide runner), Paul Raison, Michael Roeger, Brad Scott, Russell Short, Ian Speed, Tim Sullivan, Christopher Tagg (Guide runner), Darren Thrupp, Julien Wicks (Guide runner), Stephen Wilson
Women – Angela Ballard, Carlee Beattie, Jennifer Bryce, Gemma Buchholz, Kelly Cartwright, Christie Dawes, Madison de Rozario, Louise Ellery, Amanda Fraser, Courtney Harbeck, Madeleine Hogan, Kirrilee McPherson, Lisa McIntosh, Brydee Moore, Jemima Moore, Katy Parrish, Kath Proudfoot, Tahlia Rotumah, Charlotte Saville, Julie Smith, Noni Thompson, Jodi Willis-Roberts, and Christine Wolf
Coaches – Scott Goodman (Head Coach), Alison O'Riordan, Andrew Dawes, Brett Jones, John Minns, John Eden, Alan Makin, Louise Sauvage, Cathy Raha-Lambert
Officials – Gary Lees (Section Manager), Louise Mogg (Section Manager), Andrew Carter, Rowena Toppenberg, Sian Pugh, Mick Jordan, Phil Power, Steve Butler, Stephanie Martin, Jessica Gallagher

Jodi Willis-Roberts, Russell Short, and Darren Thrupp competed at their sixth Paralympics. Jessica Gallagher was selected in the team but was classified ineligible to compete. She attended the Games as a member of staff. . Australia won 10 gold, 9 silver and 7 bronze medals. Australian athletes set six world records, a further three Paralympic records and 16 Australian records during the Games. Heath Francis and Evan O'Hanlon won three gold medals.

Detailed Australian Results

=== 2012 ===
Representing Australia in athletics:

Men – Nathan Arkley, Damien Bowen, Matthew Cameron, Richard Colman, Kurt Fearnley, Sam Harding, Todd Hodgetts, Jake Lappin, Hamish MacDonald, Richard Nicholson, Evan O'Hanlon, Rheed McCracken, Sam McIntosh, Simon Patmore, Scott Reardon, Michael Roeger, Brad Scott, Russell Short, Matthew Silcocks, Tim Sullivan, Lindsay Sutton, Jack Swift
Women- Angela Ballard, Carlee Beattie, Georgia Beikoff, Kelly Cartwright, Gabriel Cole, Christie Dawes, Madison de Rozario, Rachael Dodds, Jodi Elkington, Louise Ellery, Michelle Errichiello, Jessica Gallagher, Madeleine Hogan, Torita Isaac, Rosemary Little, Brydee Moore, Katy Parrish, Kristy Pond, Kath Proudfoot, Stephanie Schweitzer, Erinn Walters
Coaches – Coaches – Steve Butler, Andrew Dawes, Iryna Dvoskina, John Eden, Aaron Holt, Brett Jones, Tim Matthews, Fred Periac, Brett Robinson, Louise Sauvage Officials – Section Manager - Andrew Faichney, Don Elgin, Lynda Gusbeth, Personal Care Assistant - Stephanie Martin, Janet Rerden, Mechanic – Andrew Carter

Australia finished 10th on the athletics medal table winning 27 medals – 5 gold, 9 silver and 13 bronze. Gold medalists were – Evan O'Hanlon (gold), Richard Colman, Kelly Cartwright and Todd Hodgetts. Russell Short attended his 7th Games, Hamish MacDonald his 6th Games and Christine Dawes and Richard Nicholson their 5th Games.

Detailed Australian Results

=== 2016 ===
Representing Australia in athletics:

Men –Sam Carter, Aaron Chatman, Jaryd Clifford, Gabriel Cole, Richard Colman, Brayden Davidson, Guy Henly, Todd Hodgetts, Nicholas Hum, Kurt Fearnley, Deon Kenzie, Jake Lappin, Rheed McCracken, Sam McIntosh, Evan O'Hanlon, Chad Perris, Scott Reardon, Michael Roeger, Jayden Sawyer, Russell Short, Brad Scott, James Turner, Jesse Wyatt
Women- Rae Anderson, Angie Ballard, Carlee Beattie, Erin Cleaver, Tamsin Colley, Brianna Coop, Christie Dawes, Madison de Rozario, Taylor Doyle, Jodi Elkington-Jones, Louise Ellery, Nicole Harris, Madeleine Hogan, Isis Holt, Torita Isaac, Claire Keefer, Rosemary Little, Brydee Moore, Jemima Moore, Ella Pardy, Kath Proudfoot, Sarah Walsh Emily Tapp was selected but forced to withdraw after a burnt leg did not heal in time for the Games.
Coaches - Iryna Dvoskina, Brett Robinson, Sebastian Kuzminski, Gary Bourne, Phio Saunders, Louise Sauvage, Fred Periac, John Eden, Hamish MacDonald Officials Team Leader - Andrew Faichney, Team Managers - Lynda Gusbeth, Amy Hibbert, Team Doctor - Lisa Elkington, Physiotherapists - Victoria Moore, Bernadette Petzel, Cameron Elliott, Soft Tissue Therapists - Phillip Power, Michael Jordan, Carers - Kate McIntosh, Stephen Caddy, Mechanic - Matthew Crawford.

Australia won 26 medals – 3 gold, 9 silver and 14 bronze. Gold medalists were – Brayden Davidson, Scott Reardon and James Turner. Russell Short attended his 8th Games, Christine Dawes her 6th Games and Kurt Fearnley his fifth Games.

Detailed Australian Results

=== 2020 ===
Representing Australia in athletics:

Men - Corey Anderson, Luke Bailey, Michal Burian, Sam Carter, Jaryd Clifford Vincent Donnadieu & Tim Logan (marathon guides), Daniel Bounty, Ari Gesini, Sam Harding, Guy Henley, Todd Hodgetts, Nicholas Hum, Deon Kenzie, Rheed McCracken, Sam McIntosh, Evan O'Hanlon, Jaydon Page, Chad Perris, Scott Reardon, Michael Roeger, Jayden Sawyer, James Turner
Women - Eliza Ault-Connell, Angie Ballard, Rhiannon Clarke, Christine Dawes, Madison de Rozario, Sarah Edmiston, Isis Holt, Alissa Jordaan, Robyn Lambird, Rosemary Little, Vanessa Low, Ella Pardy, Samantha Schmidt (d), Maria Strong, Sarah Walsh
Coaches - Desmond Davis, Andrew Dawes, Iryna Dvoskina, Danny Kevan, Sebastian Kuzminski, Hamish MacDonald, Fred Periac, Philo Saunders, Louise Sauvage, Grant Ward
Officials - Team Manager - Alison Campbell, Assistrant Team Manager - Steve Caddy, Lynda Gusbeth, Doctor - Richard Saw, Physiotherapists - Victoria Moore, Bernie Petzel, Dane Verwey, Soft Tissue Therapist - Jess Clark, Carer - Lauren Findlay, Mechanic - David Haydon

Australia won 19 medals – 4 gold, 7 silver and 8 bronze. Gold medalists were – two to Madison de Rozario and one to Vanessa Low and James Turner. Christie Dawes attended her 7th Games and Angie Ballard her 6th Games.

Detailed Australian Results

=== 2024 ===
Representing Australia in athletics:

Men - Corey Anderson, Luke Bailey, Michal Burian, Sam Carter, Jaryd Clifford with Matthew Clarke & Tim Logan (guides), Jackson Hamilton, Guy Henley, Angus Hincksman, Nicholas Hum, Reece Langdon, Rheed McCracken, Sam McIntosh, Chad Perris, Sam Rizzo, Michael Roeger, James Turner
Women - Angie Ballard, Telaya Blacksmith, Rhiannon Clarke, Sarah Clifton-Bligh, Annabelle Colman, Abby Craswell, Dayna Crees, Madison de Rozario, Sarah Edmiston, Ella Hose, Mali Lovell, Rosemary Little, Vanessa Low, Ella Pardy, Samantha Schmidt, Maria Strong, Sarah Walsh
Coaches - Matt Beckenham, Lukas Cannan, Breanna Clement, Andrew Dawes, Iryna Dvoskina, Katie Edwards, Danny Kevan, Sebastian Kuzminski, Hamish MacDonald, Scott Reardon, Fred Periac, Philo Saunders, Louise Sauvage, Dale Stevenson
Officials - Team Manager - Michael Perry, Assistant Team Manager - Steve Caddy, Emily Calwell, Doctor - Richard Saw, Physiotherapists - Darren McMillan, Bernadette Petzel, Soft Tissue Therapist - Jessica Clark, Mick Jordan, Carer - Lauren Findlay, Kate McIntosh, Mechanic - David Haydon

Australia won 11 medals – 3 gold, 2 silver and 6 bronze. Gold medalists were – two to James Turner and one to Vanessa Low. Angie Ballard her 7th Games.

Detailed Australian Results

== See also ==
- Athletics at the Summer Paralympics
- Australia at the Paralympics
