= Scott Goodman (coach) =

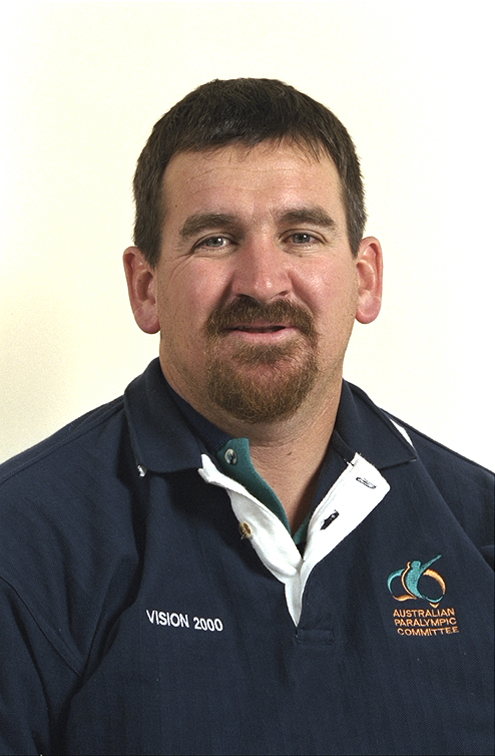
- 2000 Australian Paralympic team portrait of Goodman

Personal information
- Nationality: Australia
- Born: 27 June 1960 (age 66) Melbourne, Victoria

Sport
- Sport: Track and field

Achievements and titles
- Paralympic finals: Head Coach of the Australian Paralympic athletics team 2004 and 2008

Scott William Goodman (born 27 June 1960) is a leading Australian Paralympic athletics coach and sports administrator.

Goodman was born on 27 June 1960 in Melbourne, Victoria. In the 1980, he was a physical education teacher in Tasmania. In 1990, he completed a Master of Applied Science at Phillip Institute of Technology. His thesis was titled: An Investigation of the physical fitness of Victorian spinal cord dysfunction children and youth. In 1990, he moved to Canberra to work at the Australian Coaching Council, which was located at the Australian Institute of Sport. Between 1990 and 1998, he worked in the area of coaching athletes with a disability. This work resulted in the publication of the following important coaching resources:

- Nunn, C.J. and Goodman, S. Coaching amputee athletes. Canberra, Australian Sports Commission, 1992
- Holland, B. and Goodman, S.Coaching athletes with an intellectual disability. Canberra, Australian Sports Commission 1994
- Goodman, S. Coaching athletes with disabilities : general principles. Canberra, Australian Sports Commission, 1993
- Hockey, K. and Goodman, S. Coaching athletes with vision impairments. Canberra Australian Sports Commission, 1992
- Bremner, A. and Goodman, S.Coaching deaf athletes. Canberra, Australian Sports Commission, 1992
- Goodman, S. Coaching wheelchair athletes Canberra, Australian Sports Commission, 1996

Many of these titles were updated.

From 1998 to 2000, he was the Athletics High Performance Manager for the Australian Paralympic Committee leading into the 2000 Sydney Paralympics. From 2001 to 2010, he was employed by the Australian Institute of Sport Athletics Program in the dual roles of Manager and Head Coach of Athletics Australia’s Paralympic Preparation Program. Goodman has been an athletics coach at four successive Paralympic Games from 1996 to 2008 and was Head Coach at 2004 Athens and 2008 Beijing Games. He was an athletics manager at the 2006 and 2010 Commonwealth Games .

In May 2011, Goodman was appointed High Performance Manager for Athletics New Zealand in January 2022, Goodman after a successful period in New Zealand was appointed Director of Performance Coaching at Athletics Australia.

He has coached both able bodied and athletes with a disability over 20 years. Notable able bodied athletes include Stuart Rendell, duel Commonwealth Games gold medallist and Tim Driesen, national hammer throw title holder. Paralympic athletes that he has coached include: Hamish MacDonald, Damien Burroughs, Amanda Fraser, Murray Goldfinch, Wayne Bell and Michael Dowling. His work for disability sport was recognised in 2000 with the Australian Sports Medal and in 2008 with the Paralympic Medal. The later medal is the highest form of recognition available for a non-Paralympic competitor involved with in Australian Paralympic sport.
