= Luke Bailey (wheelchair racer) =

Australian Paralympic athlete

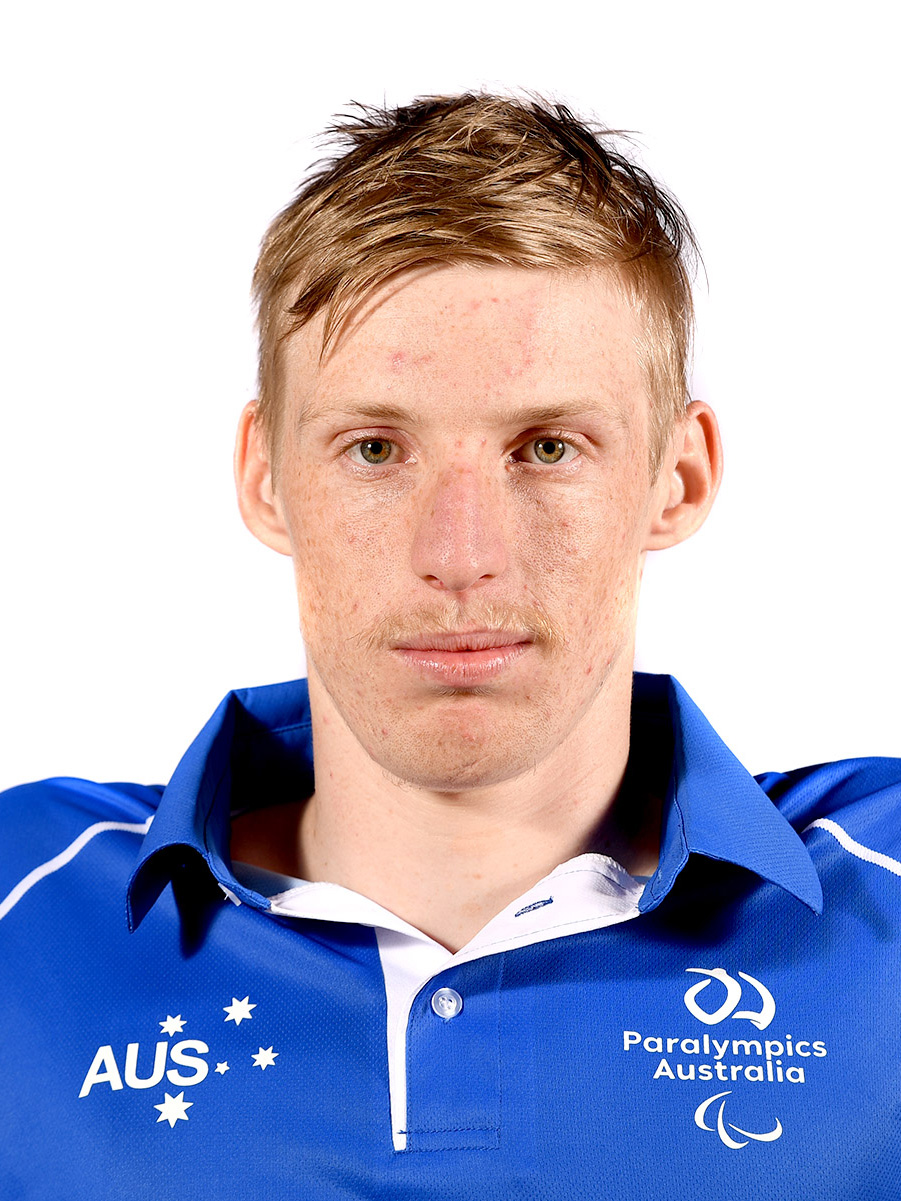
- Luke Bailey in 2019

Personal information
- Nationality: Australian
- Born: 17 September 1997 (age 28) Wingham, New South Wales

Sport
- Disability class: T54
- Coached by: Andrew Dawes
Medal record
Men's para-athletics
Representing Australia
World Championships
Bronze medal – third place	2025 New Delhi	Universal 4 × 100 m relay

Luke Bailey (born 17 September 1997) is an Australian wheelchair racer. He represented Australia at the 2020 Tokyo Paralympics and the 2024 Paris Paralympics .

== Early life ==
Luke Bailey was born on 17 September 1997 in Wingham, New South Wales. He has caudal regression syndrome and spina bifida. In 2019, he moved to Newcastle, New South Wales to train.

== Athletics career ==
Bailey is classified as T54. After an introduction to Kurt Fearnley, he took up Para-athletics in 2011.

An elbow injury prevented him from competing at the national trials for the 2018 Commonwealth Games, Gold Coast, Queensland.

At the 2019 World Para Athletics Championships, he finished seventh in the Men's 100 m T54 and eighth in the Mixed 4 × 100 m relay.

At the 2020 Tokyo Paralympics Bailey finished 14th in his Men's 100m T54 heat and did not advance to the final.

Bailey competed in three events at the 2023 World Para Athletics Championships in Paris - 100m, 400m and 800m T54 events. In the lead up to the 2024 Summer Paralympics in Paris, Bailey finished fourth in the Men's 100m T54 at the 2024 World Para Athletics Championships in Kobe.

At the 2024 Paris Paralympics, Bailey finished 7th in the Men's 100m T54 final and did not qualify for the 400 m and 800 m T54 finals. At the 2025 World Para Athletics Championships in New Delhi, he was ranked 10th in 100m and 16th in 400m T54 heats. He won a bronze in the Universal 4 × 100 m relay.

He coached by Andrew Dawes and a New South Wales Institute of Sport scholarship athlete.
