= Sam Rickard =

Australian Paralympic athlete

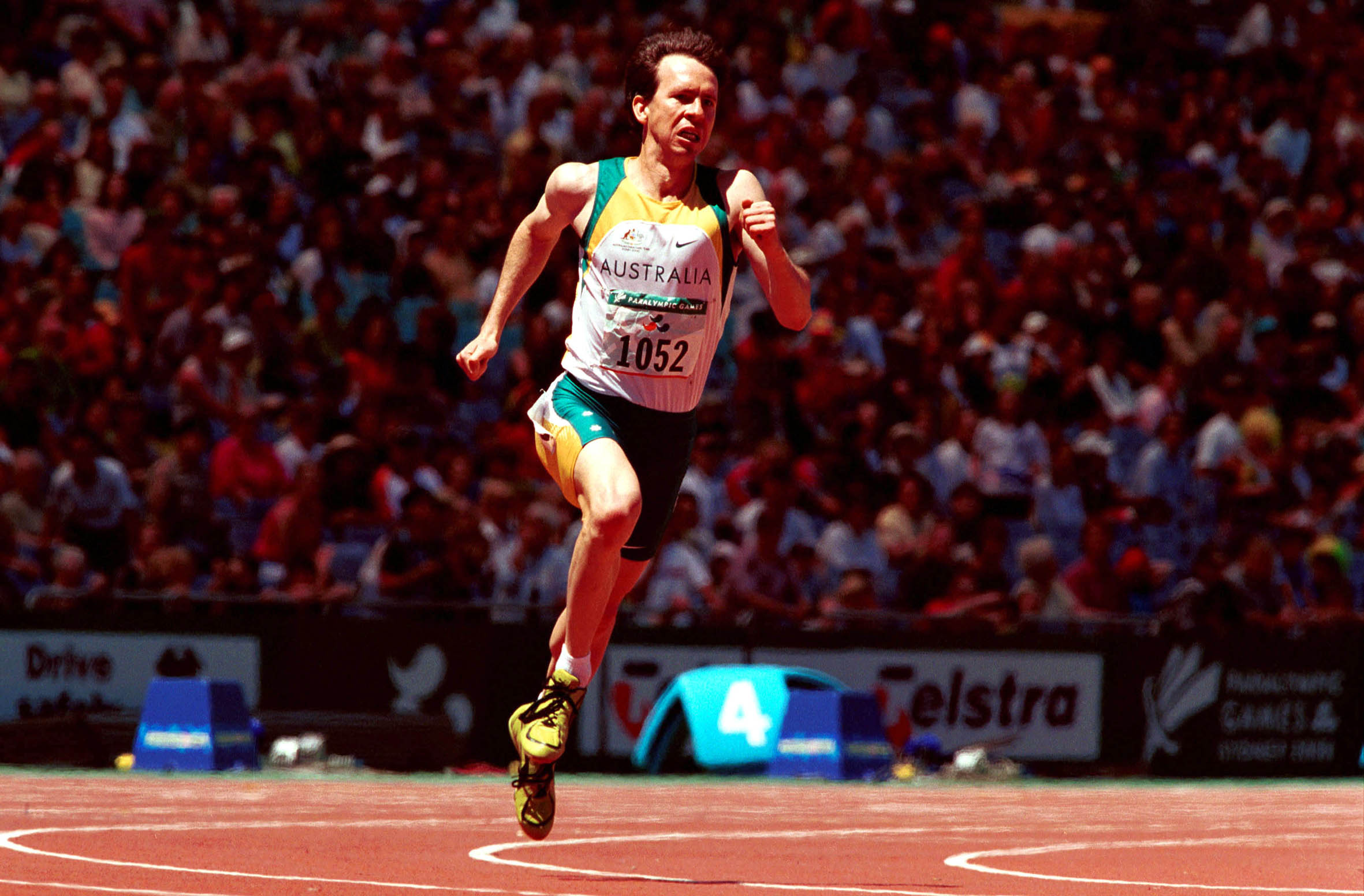
- Action shot of Rickard running at the 2000 Summer Paralympics

Personal information
- Nickname: The Sparrow
- Nationality: Australia
- Born: 8 September 1971 (age 54) Mona Vale, New South Wales
Medal record
Athletics
Paralympic Games
Bronze medal – third place	1992 Barcelona	Men's 800 m B3
World Championships and Games for the Disabled
Bronze medal – third place	1990 Assen	Men's 800m B3

Sam Rickard (born 8 September 1971, in Mona Vale, New South Wales) is an Australian vision impaired Paralympic athlete. He competed in four successive Paralympic Games 1988 to 2000, winning a bronze medal at the 1992 Barcelona Games. His nickname was 'the Sparrow'.

At the 1988 Seoul Games, he competed in Men's 400m B3, Men's 800m B3 (5th) and Men's High Jump B3 (9th). He competed in the World Championships and Games for the Disabled, Assen, Netherlands winning a bronze medal in the Men's 800m B3.

At the 1992 Barcelona Games, he won a bronze medal in the Men's 800m B3 and competed in Men's 1500m B3 (5th).

In 1994, he left the Northern Territory to accept an Australian Institute of Sport (AIS) Athletes with a Disability residential scholarship in Canberra where he was coached by Chris Nunn. He departed the AIS in 1996.

At the 1996 Atlanta Games, Sam competed in the Men's 400m T12 and Men's 1500m T12 (5th). He was disadvantaged because the 800m, his specialist distance was dropped from the Atlanta Athletics program.

Finally, 2000 Sydney Games he competed in three events – Men's 400m T13 (7th), Men's 800m T13 (4th) and Men 1500 T13 (6th).

He has been a board member of Blind Sports Australia.
