= Brydee Moore =

Australian Paralympic athlete (born 1990)

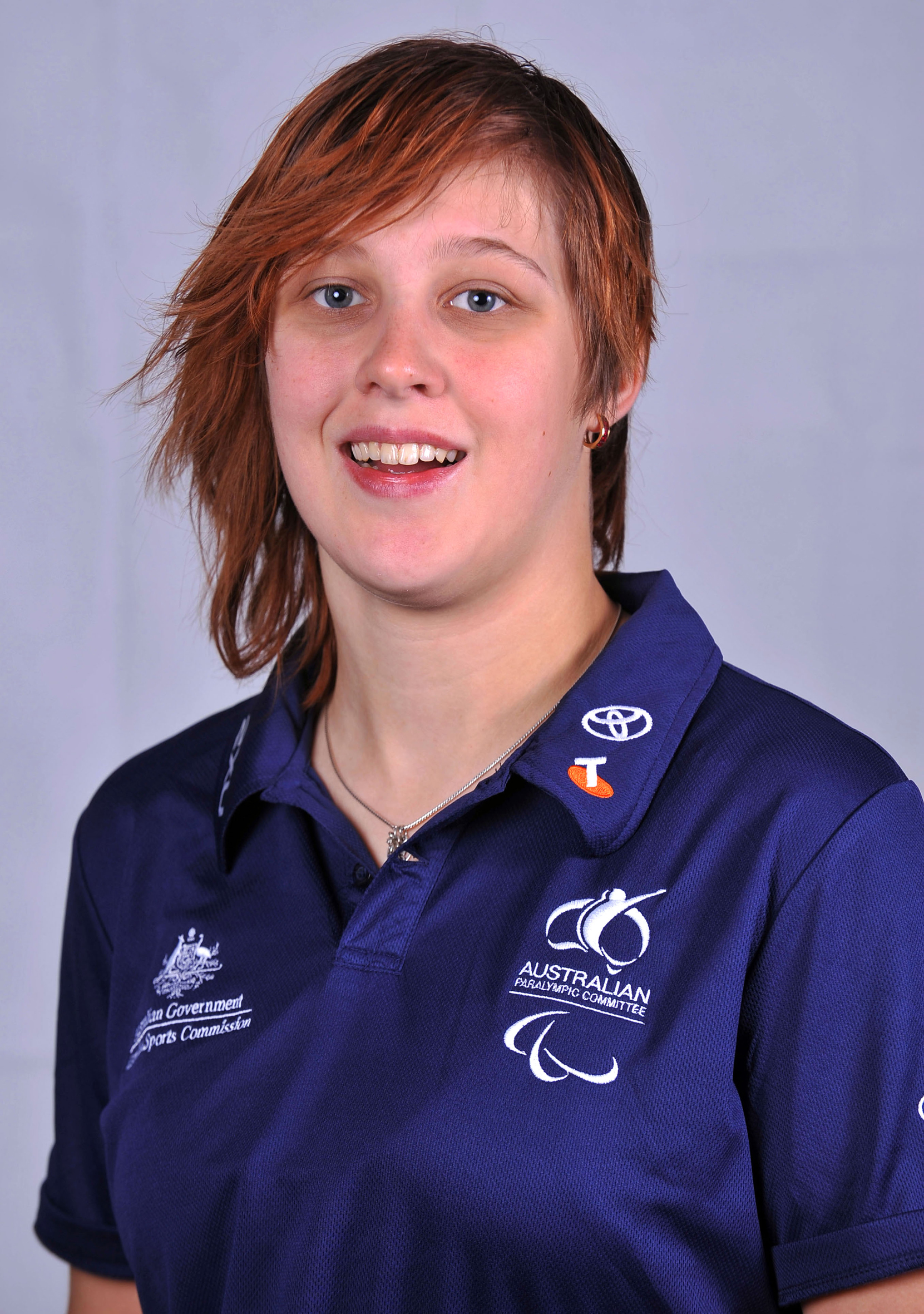
- 2012 Australian Paralympic team portrait of Moore

Personal information
- Nationality: Australian
- Born: 1 May 1990 (age 36) Melbourne

Sport
- Country: Australia
- Sport: Paralympic athletics
- Events: shot put discus javelin
Medal record
World Championships
| Silver medal – second place | 2015 Doha | Women's Shot Put F33 |

Brydee Moore (born 1 May 1990) is an Australian athlete with cerebral palsy that competes in the shot put, discus and javelin. She won a silver medal at the 2015 IPC Athletics World Championships. She represented Australia at the 2016 Rio Paralympics in athletics.

== Personal ==
Moore was born on 1 May 1990 in Melbourne. and has cerebral palsy.

== Career ==
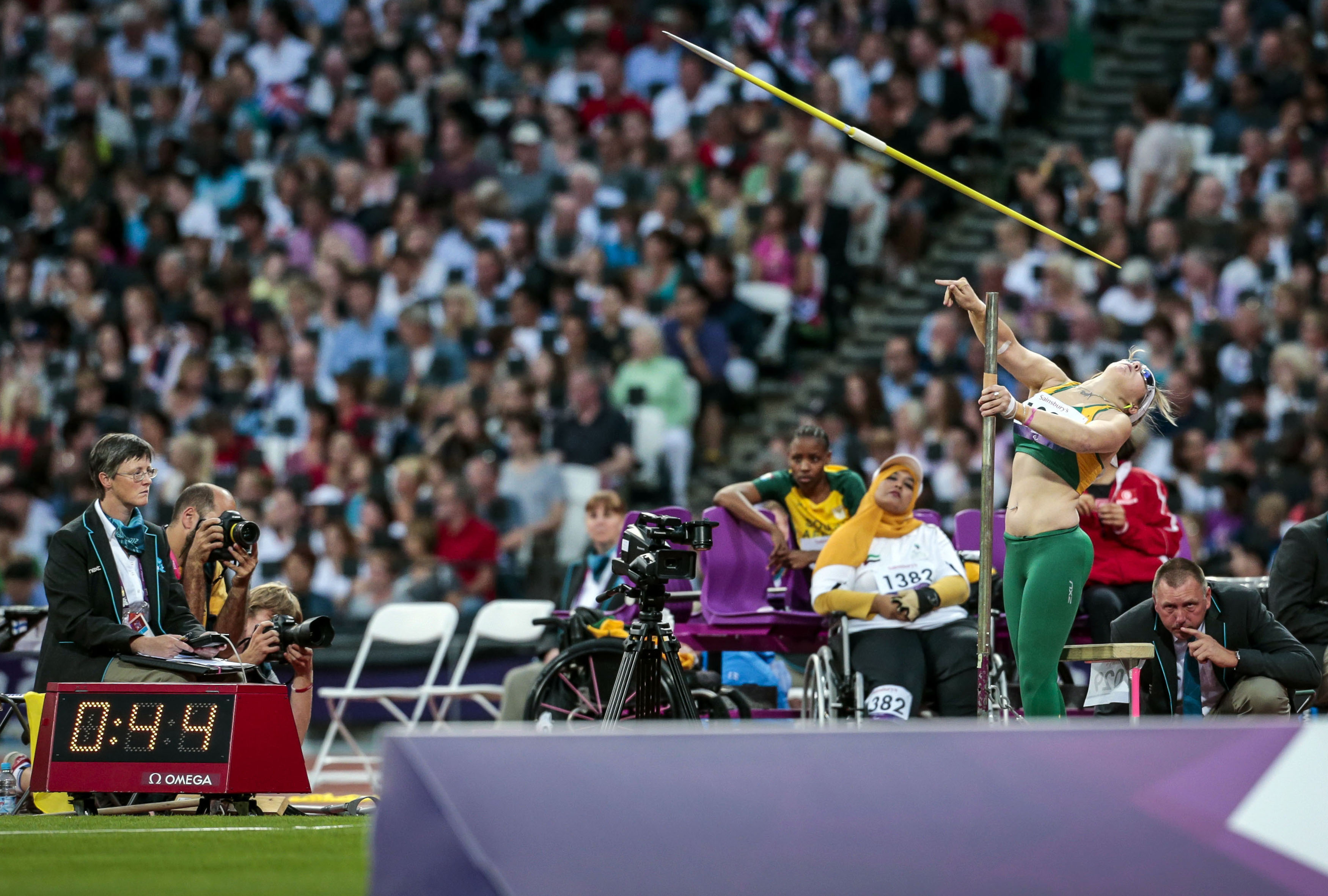
Moore throwing the javelin at the 2012 London Paralympics

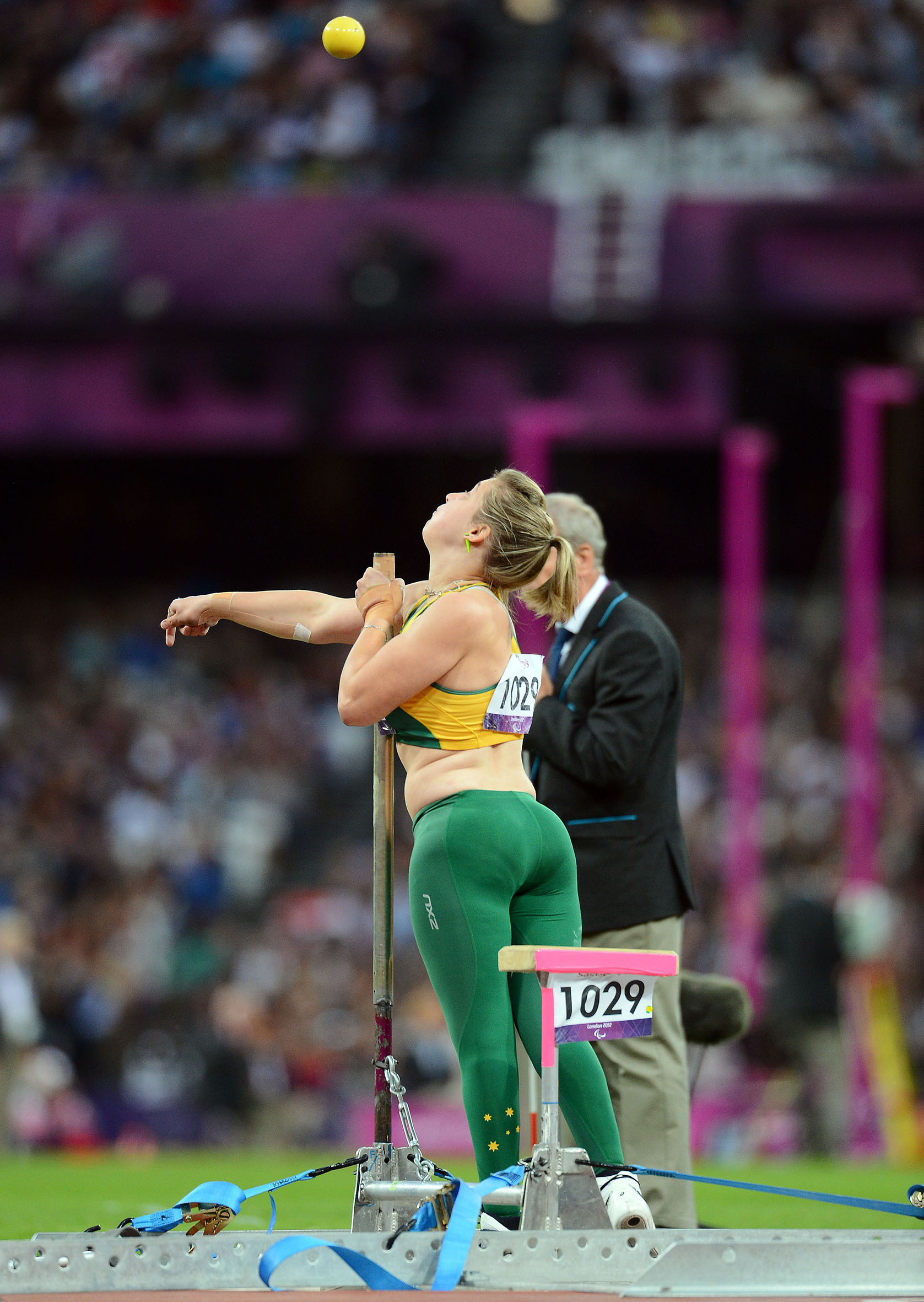
Moore throwing the shot put at the 2012 London Paralympics

Moore started athletics at the age of seven as she wanted to participate in Saturday sport like her sisters. Her first major international competition was the 2006 FESPIC Games in Kuala Lumpur where she won two gold medals. She competed in the 2008 Summer Paralympics in the seated shot put, discus and javelin events as an eighteen-year-old. She finished thirteen in the women's javelin throw (F33/34/52/53) event. She trained with Madeleine Hogan in the lead up to the Games. At the Games, she was coached by John Eden. She competed in the 2010 Commonwealth Games. In the women's severe to moderate quadriplegia/cerebral palsy shot put event, she threw a distance of 5.85 metres. At the 2012 London Paralympics she finished sixth in the women's shot put F32–34 with a throw of 6.05m and tenth in the women's javelin F33–34/52–53 with 10.55m.

Moore won her first international medal by winning the silver medal in the women's shot put F33 at the 2015 IPC Athletics World Championships in Doha with a season best throw of 5.20m. Moore originally finished third but a disqualification moved her to second. After winning the silver medal, Moore said: "This is a dream come true. I never thought this would happen. I always thought I had a chance, but I honestly can’t believe it. The only way is up now. I can only get better from here and hopefully that means an even better result in Rio next year. It's really exciting. This shows that I can do the same things that everybody else can, just in a different way. I’ve proved that tonight and I am so proud of myself for getting out there and being my best."

Her philosophy is "see the athlete not the disability".

Moore competed in the 2016 Rio Paralympics placing fifth in the Women's F33 Shot put event.

At the 2017 World Para Athletics Championships in London, England, she was fifth in the Women's Shot Put F33 with a throw of 4.40m.

She is a Victorian Institute of Sport scholarship holder.

== Recognition ==
- 2006 – Variety Club's Junior Sportsperson Award
- 2004 and 2005 – Best Female Athlete, Wheelchair Sports Victoria
