= Sharon Rackham =

Australian Paralympic athlete

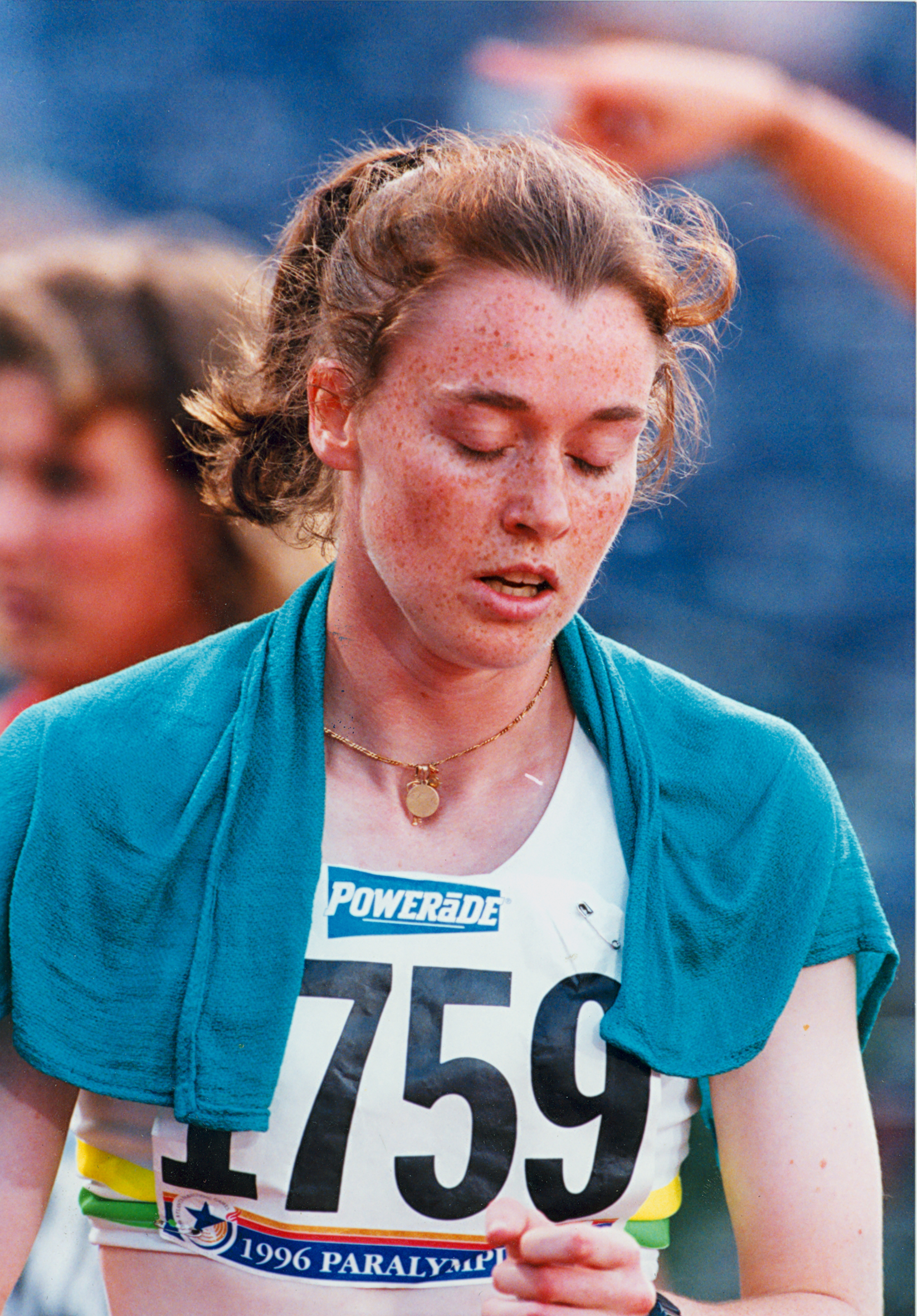
- Rackham at the 1996 Paralympics

Personal information
- Full name: Sharon Margaret Rackham
- Nationality: Australia
- Born: 25 July 1974 (age 51) Tongatapu, Tonga

Sport
- Sport: Para athletics
- Disability class: T20
Medal record
Women's para athletics
Representing Australia
Paralympic Games
Gold medal – first place	1996 Atlanta	200 m T20
Silver medal – second place	2000 Sydney	200 m T20
World Championships
Gold medal – first place	1994 Berlin	200 m T20
Gold medal – first place	1998 Birmingham	200 m T20

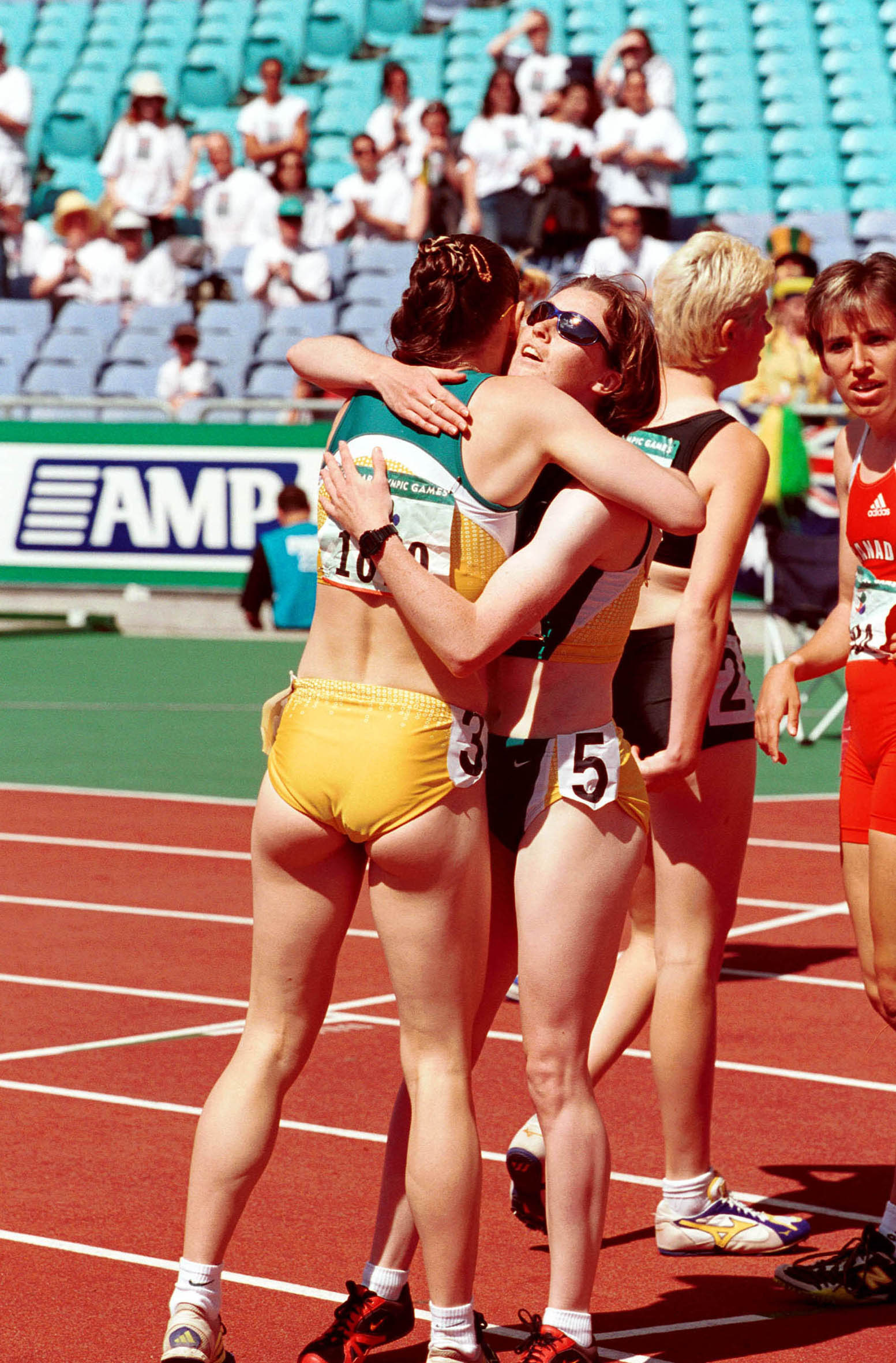
Rackham (right) hugs fellow Australian track athlete Lisa Llorens at the 2000 Summer Paralympics

Sharon Margaret Rackham, OAM (born 25 July 1974) is an Australian Paralympic athlete.

== Biography ==
She was born on 25 July 1974 in Tongatapu, Tonga. She won a gold medal in the T20 200m at the 1996 Summer Paralympics in Atlanta, for which she received a Medal of the Order of Australia, and a silver medal in the 200 m T20 at the 2000 Summer Paralympics. In 2000, she received an Australian Sports Medal.
