= Katy Parrish =

Australian paralympic athlete (born 1991)

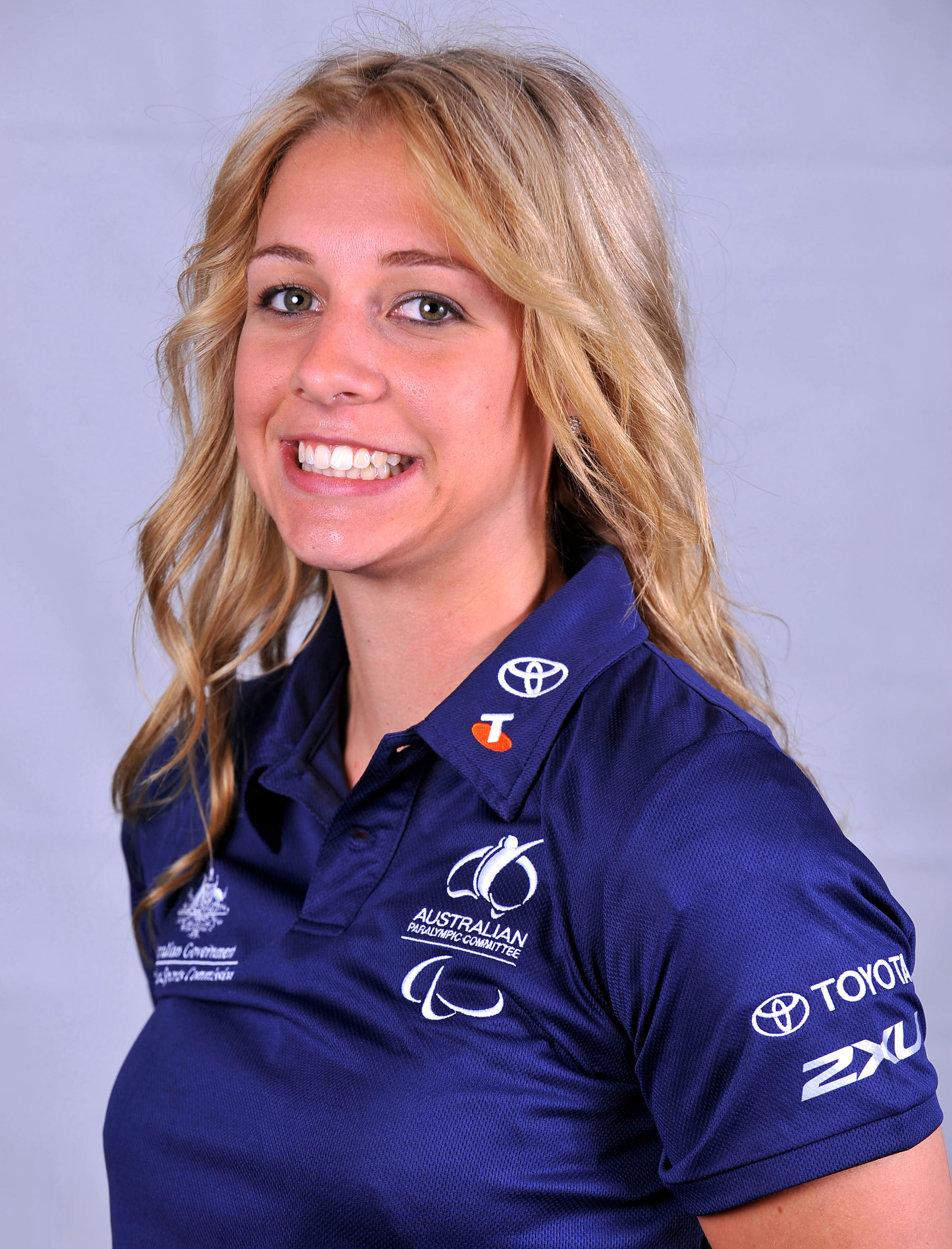
- 2012 Australian Paralympic team portrait of Parrish

Personal information
- Nationality: Australian
- Born: 4 July 1991 (age 35)

Sport
- Country: Australia
- Sport: Athletics

Kathryn 'Katy' Parrish (born 4 July 1991) is an Australian athletics competitor. She was selected to represent at the 2008 Beijing Paralympic Games 2008 Summer Paralympics and at the 2012 Summer Paralympics in athletics in the 4 × 100 metre relay, 100 metres, 200 metres and long jump events.

== Personal ==
Parrish was born on 4 July 1991 in Adelaide, South Australia. After finishing high school she trained in Melbourne, Victoria as an elite athlete in sprints and long jump under retired Paralympian Tim Matthews. Parrish was born with cerebral palsy that affects the left side of her body. She was diagnosed with the condition when she was three years old. Parrish represented Australia at the 2008 Beijing Paralympic Games and the 2012 London Paralympic Games She has three older brothers. While in school, she did a number of sports including netball, water polo, touch football and knee boarding.

== Athletics ==
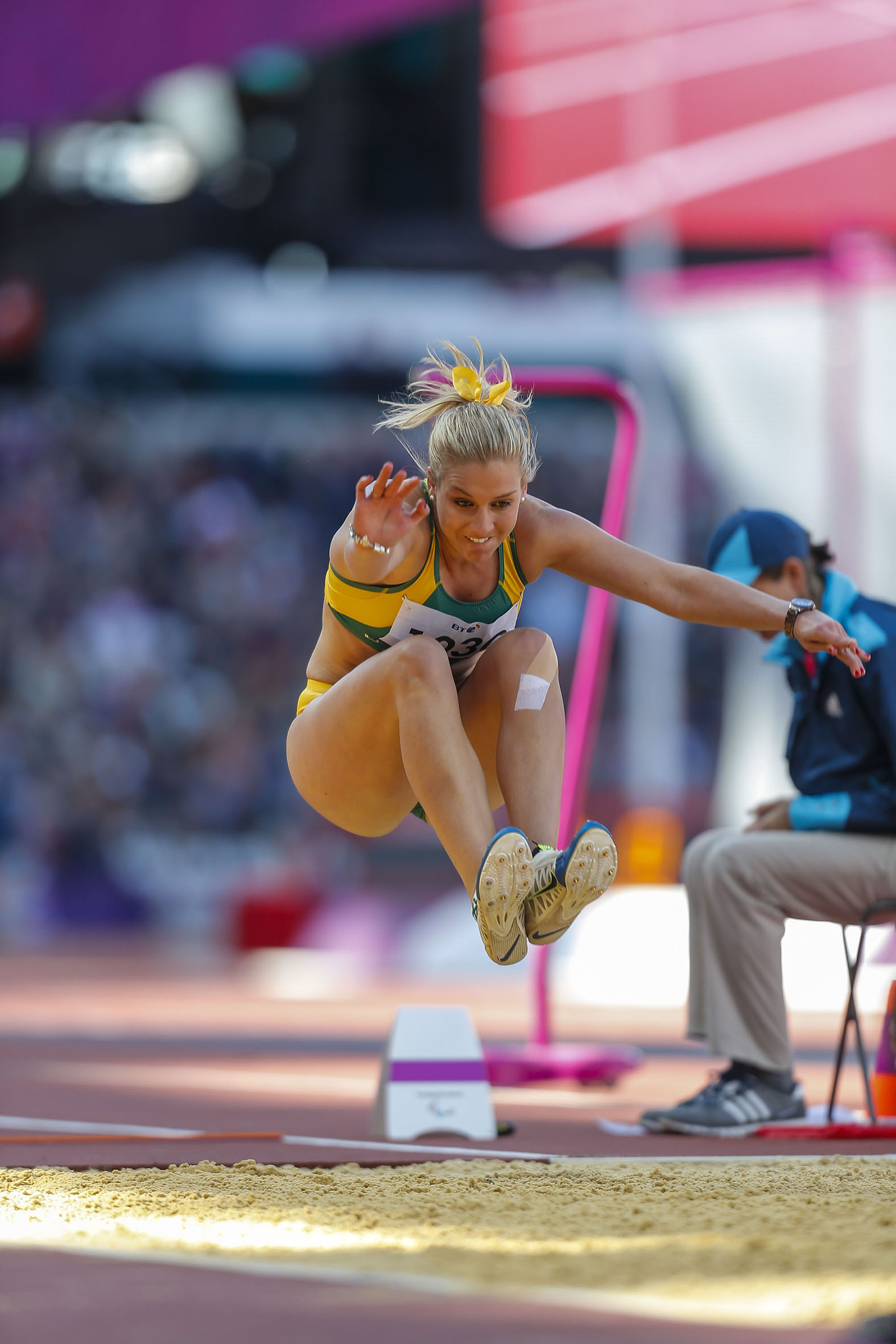
Parrish at the 2012 London Paralympics

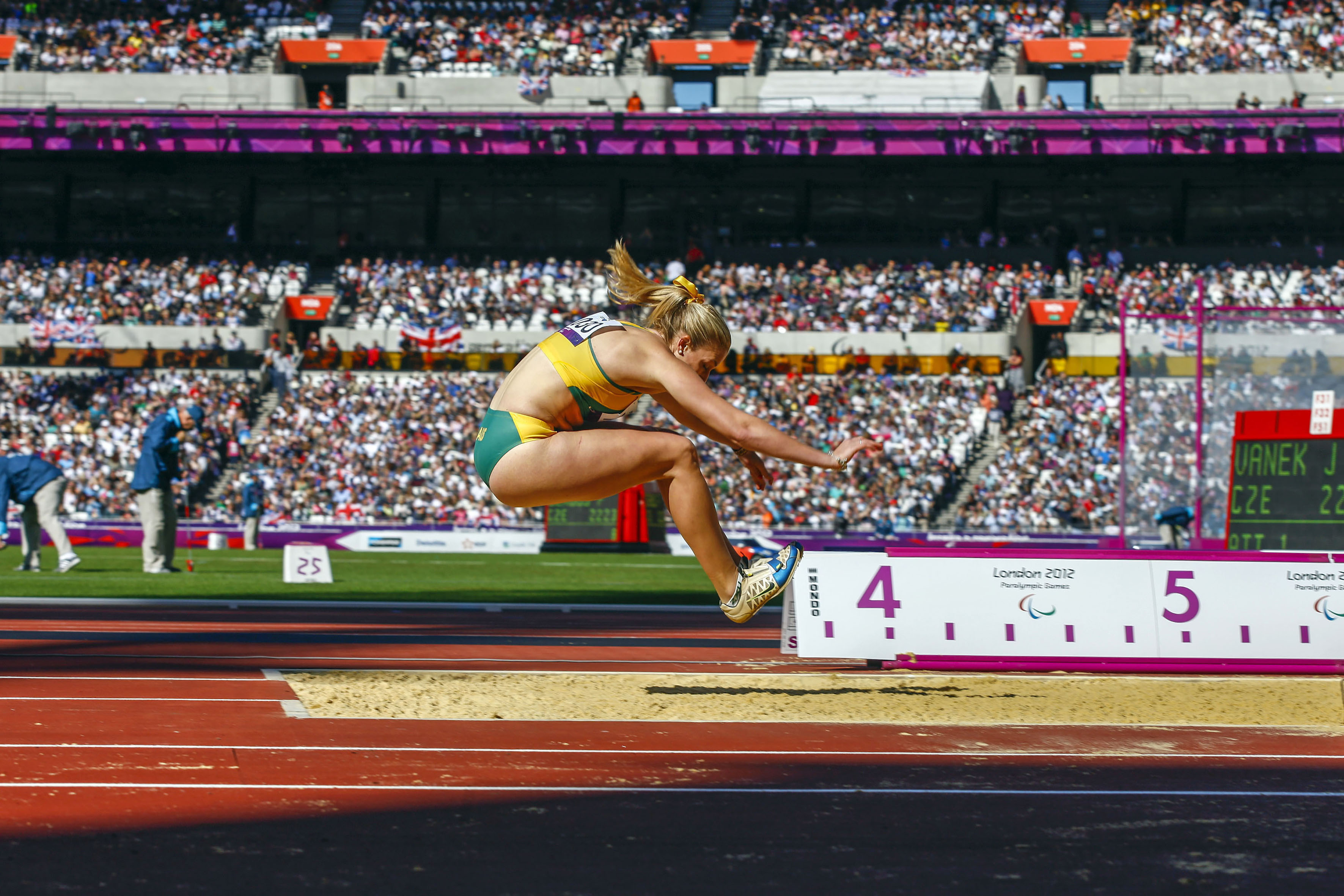
Parrish at the 2012 London Paralympics

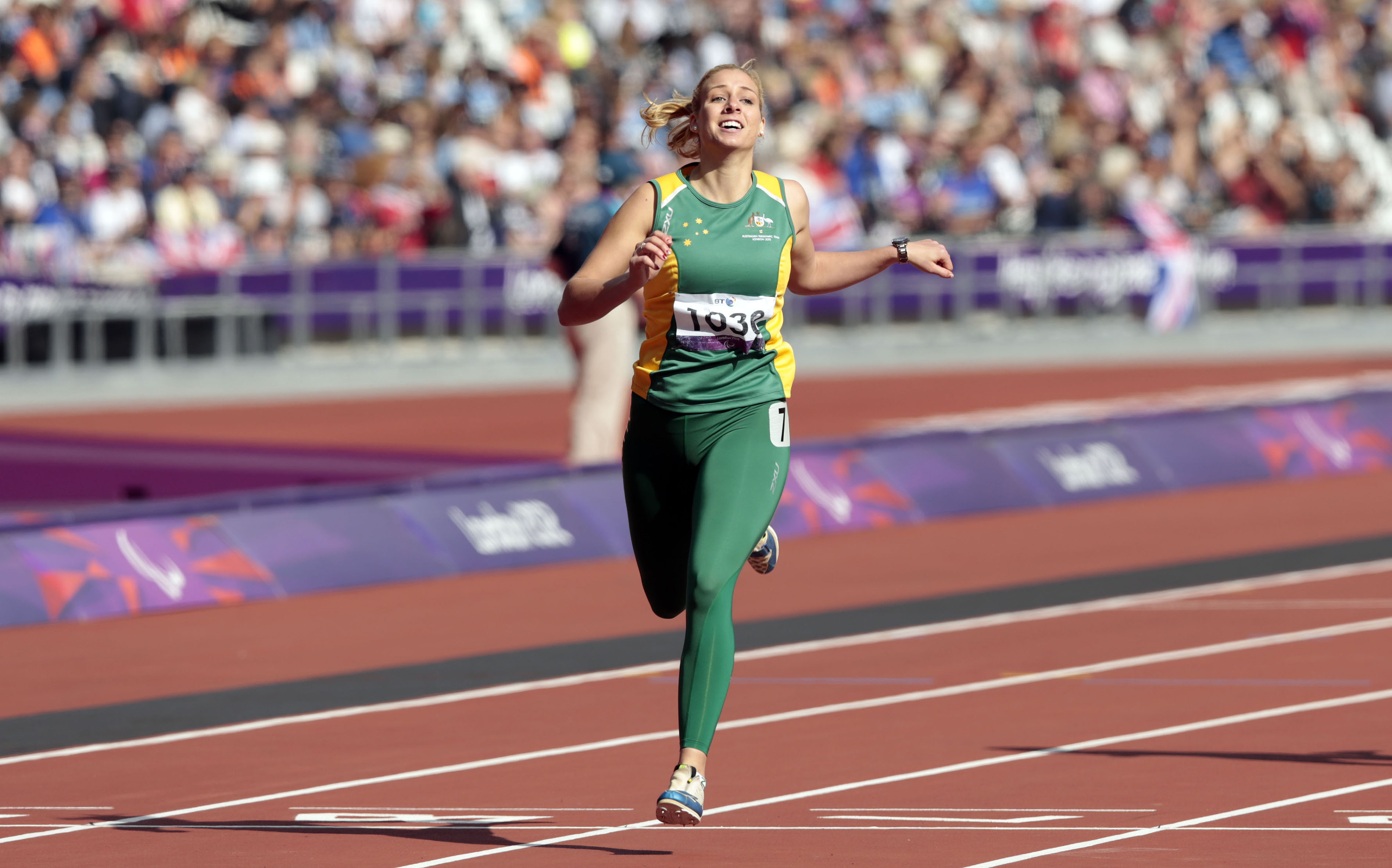
Parrish at the 2012 London Paralympics

Parrish is a T38 classified athletics competitor who specialises in the 100 metres, 200 metres and the long jump. In 2008, she had a scholarship with the Australian Institute of Sport. As of 2012, she has a scholarship with the Victorian Institute of Sport, and trains with Tim Matthews in Melbourne, Victoria.

Parrish started competing in 2006, following an Adelaide-based Australian Paralympic talent search event. She first represented Australia at the 2007 Arafura Games, where she won a gold medal in the 100 metre event and another gold medal in the 200 metre event. She set national records in the 100 metre and 200 metre events for Australia at the 2008 Australian National Championships. She represented Australia at the 2008 Summer Paralympics, making the finals in the 100 metre and 200 metre events. She finished eighth overall in the 100 metres and fifth overall in the 200 metres event. At the 2011 Arafura Games, she finished second in the Women Long Jump Ambulant event with a distance of 3.98 metres, and earned two gold medals. She competed in the 2012 Australian Athletics Championships. With a jump of 4.35 metres, she won the long jump event. She was selected to represent Australia at the 2012 Summer Paralympics in athletics in the 4 × 100 metre relay, 100 metres, 200 metres and long jump events.
