= Madeleine Hogan =

Australian Paralympic athlete (born 1988)

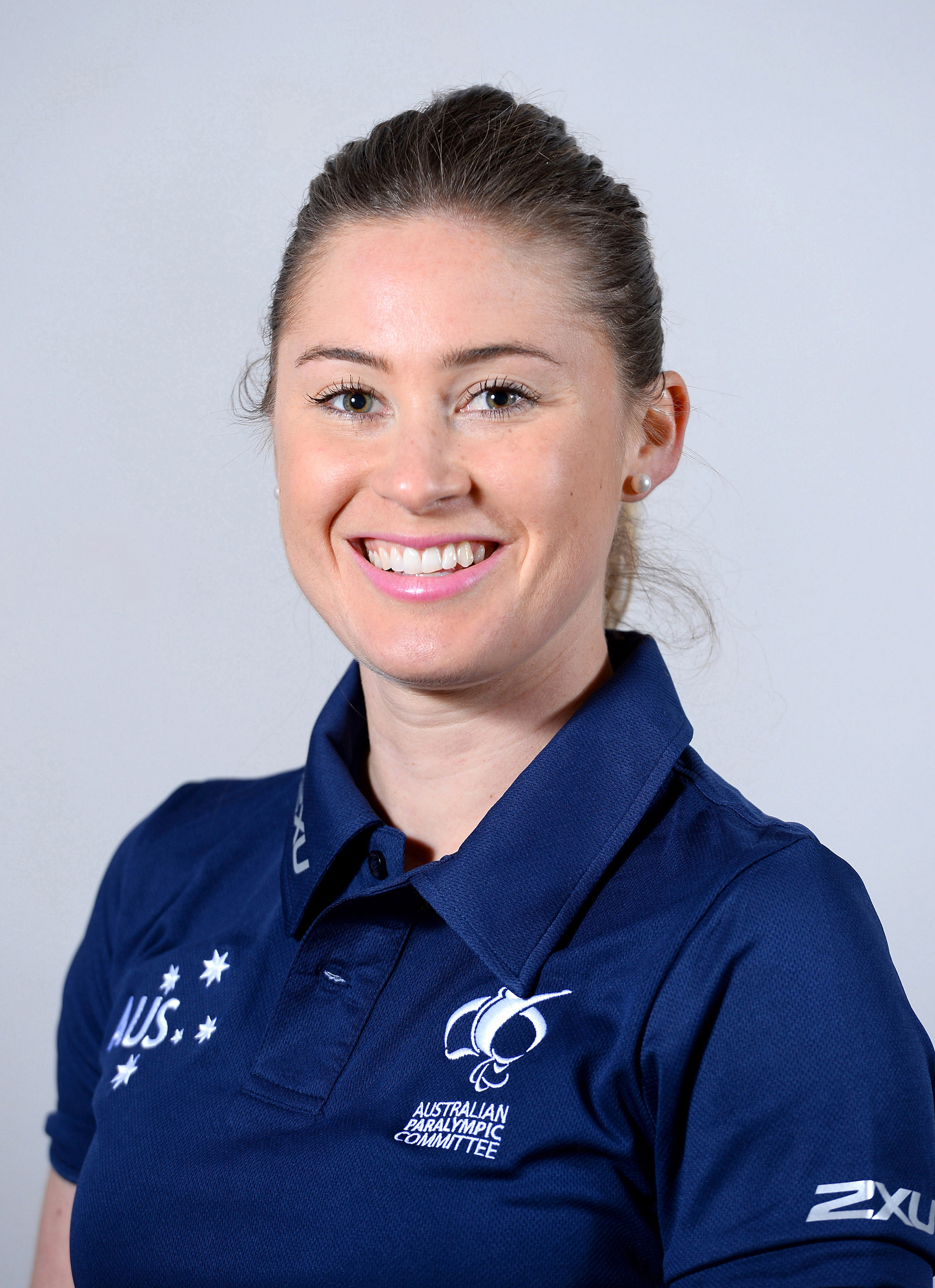
- 2016 Australian Paralympic team portrait of Hogan

Personal information
- Nickname: Maddy
- Nationality: Australia
- Born: 8 December 1988 (age 37) Ferntree Gully, Victoria

Sport
- Sport: Athletics
- Event: Javelin
- Club: Knox Athletics Club
Medal record
Track and field (athletics)
Representing Australia
Paralympic Games
Bronze medal – third place	2008 Beijing	Women's Javelin Throw - F42-46
Bronze medal – third place	2012 London	Women's Javelin Throw - F46
IPC Athletics World Championships
Gold medal – first place	2011 Christchurch	Women's Javelin Throw - F46

Madeleine Hogan (born 8 December 1988) is a Paralympic athlete from Australia competing mainly in category F42/F46 javelin throw events. She has won bronze medals at the 2008 Summer Paralympics and 2012 Summer Paralympics. She represented Australia at the 2016 Rio Paralympics in athletics.

== Early life ==
Hogan was born in the Melbourne suburb of Ferntree Gully, situated in the Dandenong Ranges, on 8 December 1988, without the lower half of her left arm. She has two siblings, Brock and Courtney. As a teenager between 2001 and 2006, Hogan completed years 7 through 12 at Brentwood Secondary College in Glen Waverley. After graduation, she went on to study Exercise and Sport Science at Deakin University.

== Career ==
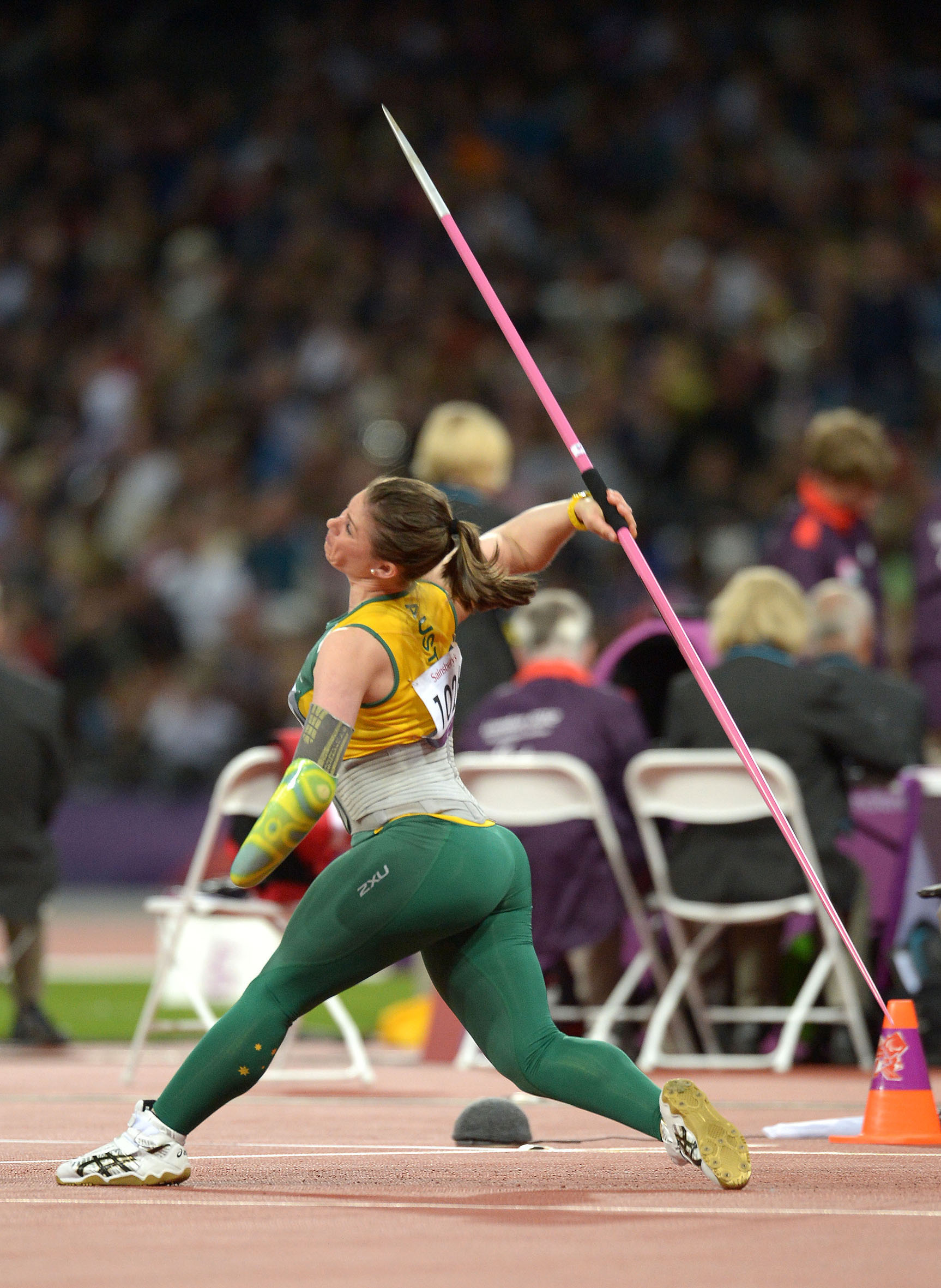
Hogan at the 2012 London Paralympics

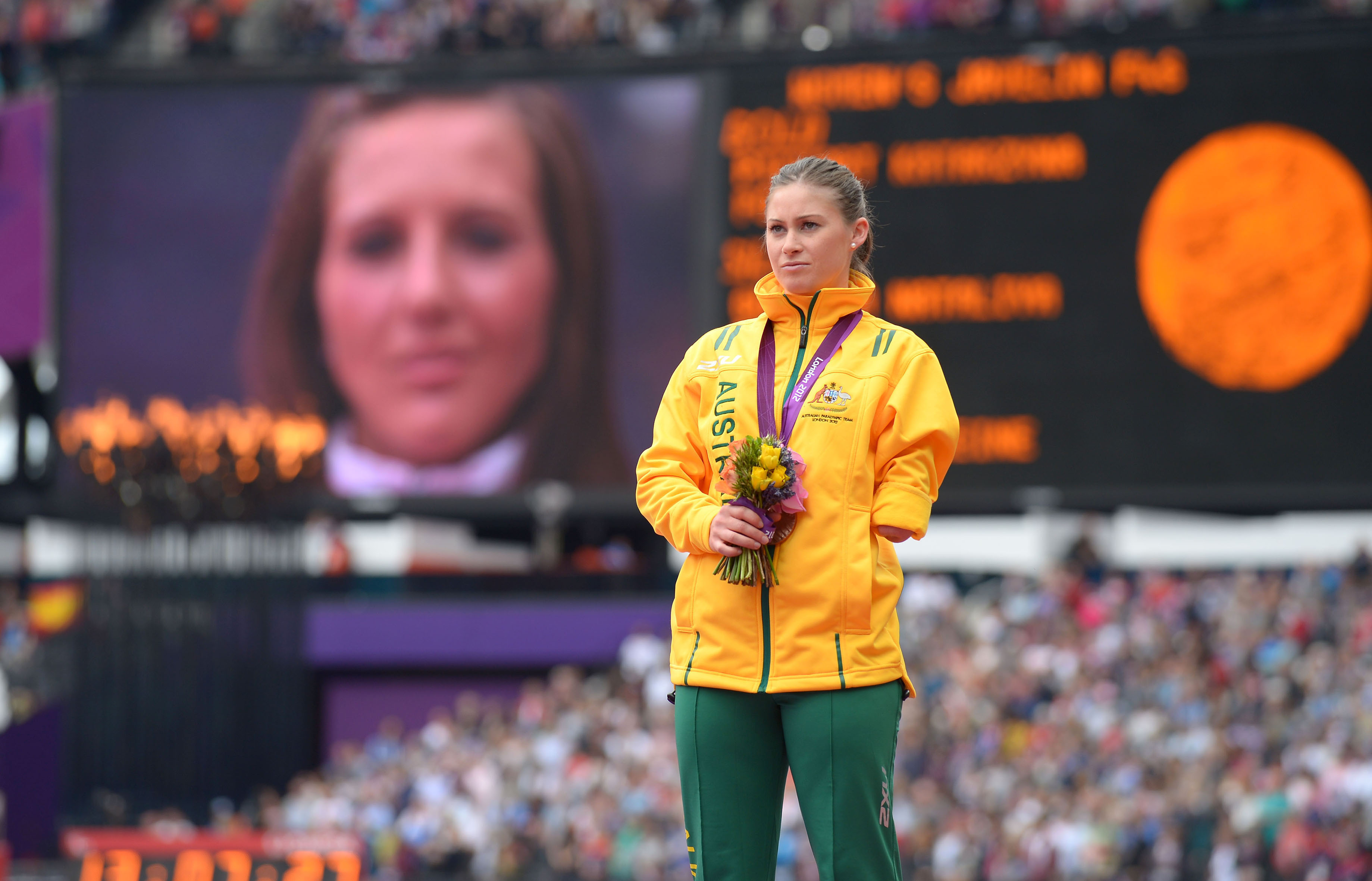
Hogan at the 2012 London Paralympics

Hogan was highly involved in sport whilst in school and her ability identified in an athletics talent search day in 2005. She took up athletics seriously in 2006. She is a member of the Knox Athletics Club in Melbourne.

At the 2008 Beijing Paralympics, she won the bronze medal in the Women's Javelin F46. Prior to the 2011 IPC Athletics World Championships in Christchurch, she tore a tendon in her right throwing arm but overcame the injury to win the gold medal in the Women's Javelin F46 with a distance of 37.79 m. Hogan's winning throw was four metres better than her nearest rivals Natalia Gudkova (33.65m) of Russia, in silver position, and Hollie Beth Arnold (32.45m) of Great Britain, in bronze. At the 2012 Summer Paralympics in London, Hogan won a bronze medal in the Women's Javelin F46.

She was forced to withdraw from the 2015 IPC Athletics World Championships in Doha due to rupturing her anterior cruciate ligament whilst training for the Women's Javelin F47 event. She had previously ruptured her other knee.

She is coached by John Eden and is a Victorian Institute of Sport scholarship holder.

She represented Victoria in cricket at the U19 national championships as a spin bowler and plays golf.

Since her knee surgery in early November 2015 Hogan successfully recovered from rehab and competed in the 2016 Rio Paralympics. She placed 5th overall in the F46 Javelin throw.

In the wake of Hogan's success in Rio, on 2 May 2017, she announced her retirement.
