= Matthew van Eldik =

Australian Paralympic athlete

Personal information
- Full name: Matthew Jon van Eldik
- Nationality: Australia
- Born: 16 May 1970 (age 56)
Medal record
Men's para athletics
Representing Australia
Paralympic Games
Bronze medal – third place	1988 Seoul	Slalom C4-5
World Championships
Silver medal – second place	1994 Berlin	Discus F33
Bronze medal – third place	1994 Berlin	Shot Put F33

Matthew Jon van Eldik (born 16 May 1970) is a Paralympic athletics competitor from Australia. He won a bronze medal at the 1988 Seoul Games in the Men's Slalom C4-5 event.
