= Damien Burroughs =

Australian Paralympic athlete (born 1978)

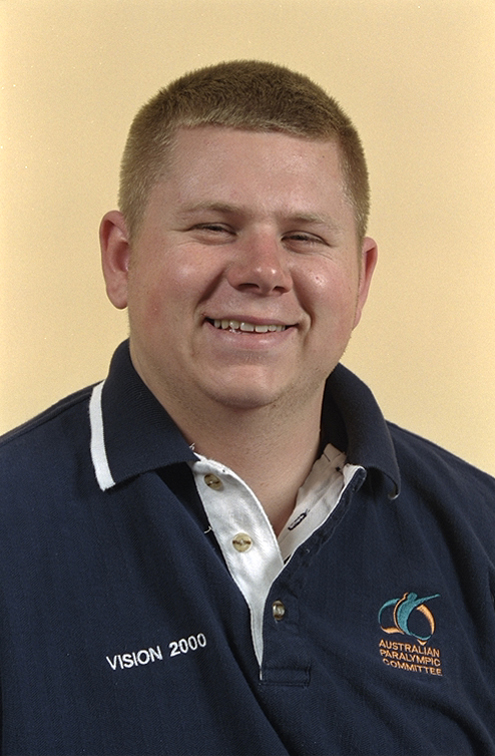
- 2000 Australian Paralympic team portrait of Burroughs

Personal information
- Full name: Damien Alexander Burroughs
- Nickname: Damo
- Nationality: Australia
- Born: 28 October 1978 (age 47) West Union, Ohio, United States
Medal record
Men's para athletics
Representing Australia
Paralympic Games
Gold medal – first place	1996 Atlanta	Discus F36
World Championships
Silver medal – second place	1998 Birmingham	Discus

Damien Alexander Burroughs,OAM (born 28 October 1978) is an Australian Paralympic athlete. He won a gold medal at the 1996 Atlanta Games and participated in the 2000 Sydney and 2004 Athens Paralympics.

== Personal life ==
Burroughs was born on 28 October 1978 in West Union, Ohio in the United States. He migrated to Australia with his family in 1979. Burroughs has a form of cerebral palsy – which affects the right side of the body.

He attended St Francis Xavier College and Hawker College in Canberra. On growing up with a disability, Burroughs commented "I was the only 'disabled' kid in my year at school so I had no choice on who I wanted to do PE [physical education] with. I did everything in PE or had a go at it. Something I was very bad at but not the worst. It made me feel better about myself. I'm sure it would make any teen feel good about themself not coming last all the time". He is nicknamed "Damo".

== Career ==
Burroughs came third in the discus at the 1994 FESPIC Games. He won a gold medal at the 1996 Atlanta Games in the Men's Discus F36 event in a world record, for which he received a Medal of the Order of Australia. He finished 8th in the Men's Shot Put F36 event, with a personal best.

In 1997, he was awarded a scholarship with the Australian Institute of Sport Athletes with a Disability program and was coached by Scott Goodman. He stayed on scholarship until 2002. In 1997, he threw the discus 38.18m to break the world record.

He came 2nd in the discus and 8th in the shot put at the 1998 IPC Athletics World Championships. At the 2000 Sydney Games, he competed in the Men's Discus F37 (4th), Men's Javelin F37 (14th), and Men's Shot Put F37 (7th).

In 2002, he again competed at the IPC Athletics World Championships, coming 7th in the discus and 9th in the shot put. At the 2004 Athens Games, he competed in Men's Discus F37 (5th), Men's Javelin F37 (8th), and Men's Shot Put F37 (6th). At the pre-departure meet for the 2006 IPC Athletics World Championships, he broke the Australian record for discus with a throw of 44.41 m. At the championships, he came 7th in the discus.

== Recognition ==
Burroughs was named the Developing Male Paralympian of the Year in 1996. In 2000, he received an Australian Sports Medal for giving "many years service to the Paralympic movement as a loyal athlete".
