= John Eden (athlete) =

New Zealand paralympic athlete (born 1955)

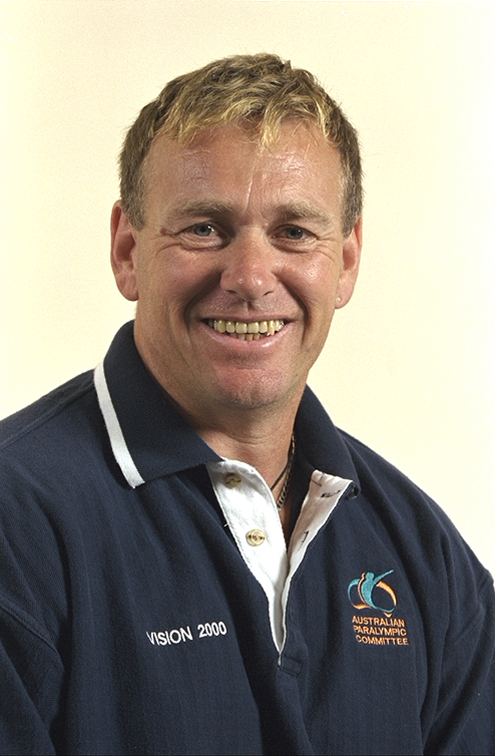
- 2000 Australian Paralympic team portrait of Eden

Personal information
- Full name: John Desmond Eden
- Nationality: New Zealand
- Born: 27 October 1955 (age 70) Wellington, New Zealand
Medal record
Men's para athletics
Representing New Zealand
Paralympic Games
Silver medal – second place	1980 Arnhem	High Jump C
Representing Australia
Paralympic Games
Silver medal – second place	1992 Barcelona	Discus THS2
Bronze medal – third place	1988 Seoul	Discus A2A9
Bronze medal – third place	1996 Atlanta	Discus F42
World Championships and Games for the Disabled
Bronze medal – third place	1990 Assen	Discus 5F
IPC World Championships
Gold medal – first place	1994 Berlin	Discus

John Desmond Eden (born 27 October 1955) is a leg-amputee athlete and Australian and New Zealand Paralympian.

== Personal ==
Eden was born in Wellington, New Zealand and given up for adoption by his young parents. Eden attended Matamata High School and left home at the age of 15. He completed Year 12 certificate through night school while working during the day. At this time his main focus was to become an All Blacks rugby player. In 1976, he lost his right leg below the knee in a motorcycle accident. The day before his accident, Eden was advised of his selection in the Junior All Blacks. He continued to play rugby at senior club reserves level but two years later his right knee was seriously damaged and he underwent an amputation above the knee. He met another amputee, Brian Portland who encouraged him to become New Zealand's first amputee Paralympian. This was the start of a 20-year career in competitive Paralympic athletics.

In 1994, Eden's fiancé Mandy was killed in a car accident. Mandy had played a large part in reuniting him with his birth parents. Eden's father was a New Zealand representative in boxing, softball and rugby league.

== Career ==
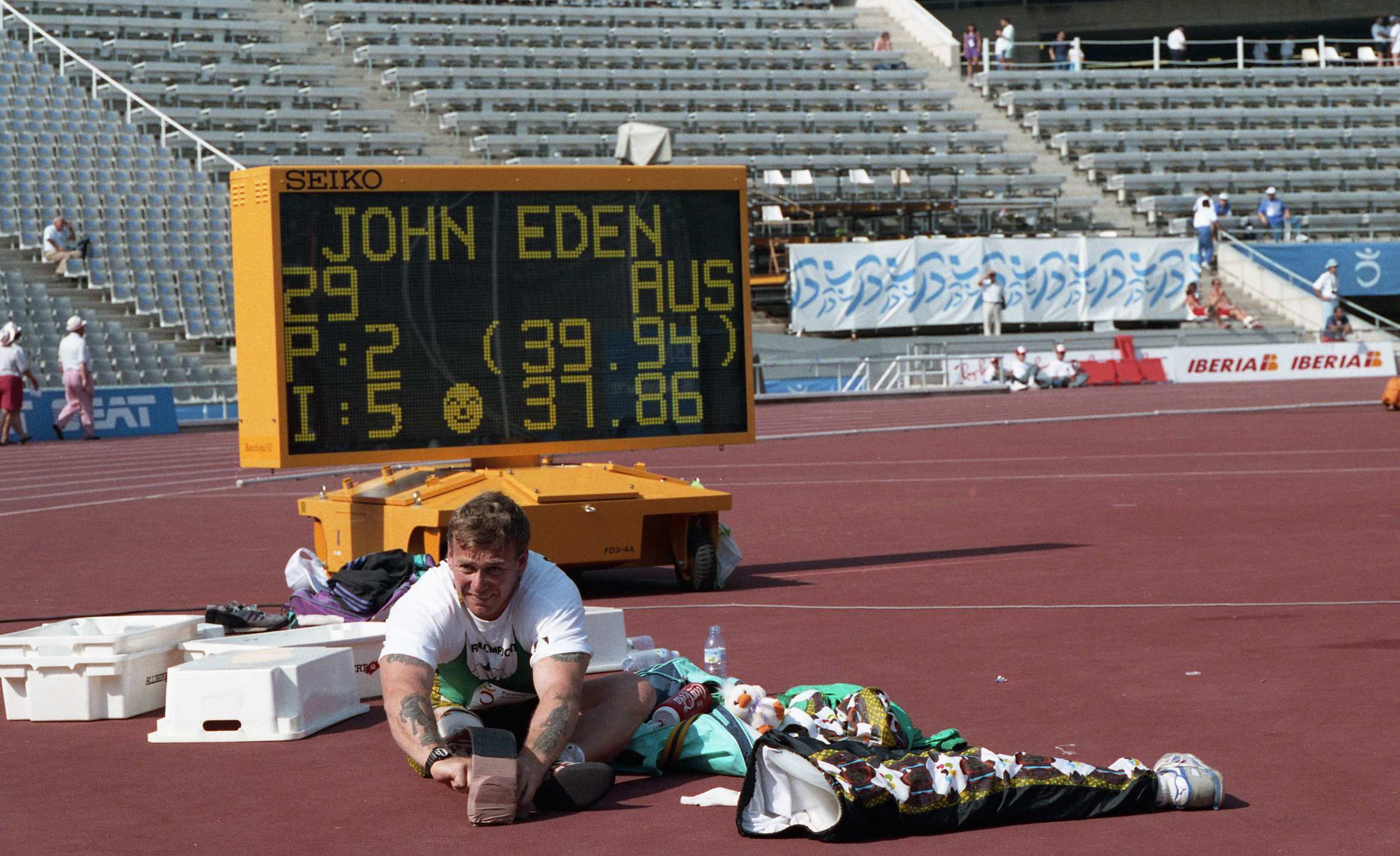
Eden seen at the 1992 Barcelona Paralympics where he won a silver in the Men's Discus THS2

Eden won a silver medal in the Men's high jump C event at the 1980 Arnhem Games. He also competed in the Men's 100 m C, 400 m C and Men's Long Jump C athletics events, and the Men's 100 m Freestyle C-D – swimming event. In 1982, he emigrated to Australia due to inadequate support to New Zealand Paralympic athletes. In 1984, he decided to turn his attention to the discus and stated I was not really tall enough (for the high jump) and lost a lot of natural spring after the second amputation.

At the 1988 Seoul Paralympics, he competed for Australia and won a bronze medal in the Men's Discus A2A9 event. At the 1990 World Championships and Games for the Disabled in Assen, Netherlands, he won a bronze medal in the men's discus 5F.

In 1991, the Australian Institute of Sport (AIS) established an Athletics with a Disability Program and he became an inaugural scholarship holder and was coached by Chris Nunn. In joining the AIS, Eden stated "Having this opportunity to train at the AIS has made all the difference and helped me improve immeasurably. And working with a coach like Chris increases my desire to continue with sport and, eventually to take up coaching myself".

At the 1992 Barcelona Paralympics, he won a silver medal in the Men's Discus THS2 event and competed in the Men's Long Jump J1, Men's Shot Put THS2 and Men's Pentathlon PS3 events.

He also competed in the 1994 IPC Athletics World Championships in Berlin, where he won a gold medal in discus and set a world record.

Eden won a bronze medal in the Men's Discus F42 event at the 1996 Atlanta Paralympics.

His Paralympic Games career as a competitor finished at the 2000 Sydney Paralympics where he competed in the Men's Discus F42 and Men's 100 m T42 events. At the end of his Paralympic career in 2000, Eden said "I like competing; it is a nice way to meet people and it makes me feel normal. The Paralympics are the pinnacle for athletes like me and this is a very nice way to live my life".

Eden's athletic ability was highlighted at the AIS in 1995, where in a resistance test he recorded the highest score. The test included able bodied throwers including John Minns, multiple Australian shot put champion.

== Coaching ==
Eden's love of sport has continued through coaching at Frankston Athletics Club and the Victorian Institute of Sport. He has coached Paralympic bronze medallist Don Elgin and Dale Stevenson, a bronze medalist at the 2010 Delhi Commonwealth Games.

Eden is currently coaching Paralympic athletes Madeleine Hogan, a world leading F46 javelin thrower, Charlotte Saville, and Brydee Moore. He was an athletics coach with the Australian team at the 2004 Athens Games and 2008 Beijing Games.
