= John Lindsay (Paralympian) =

Australian Paralympic athlete

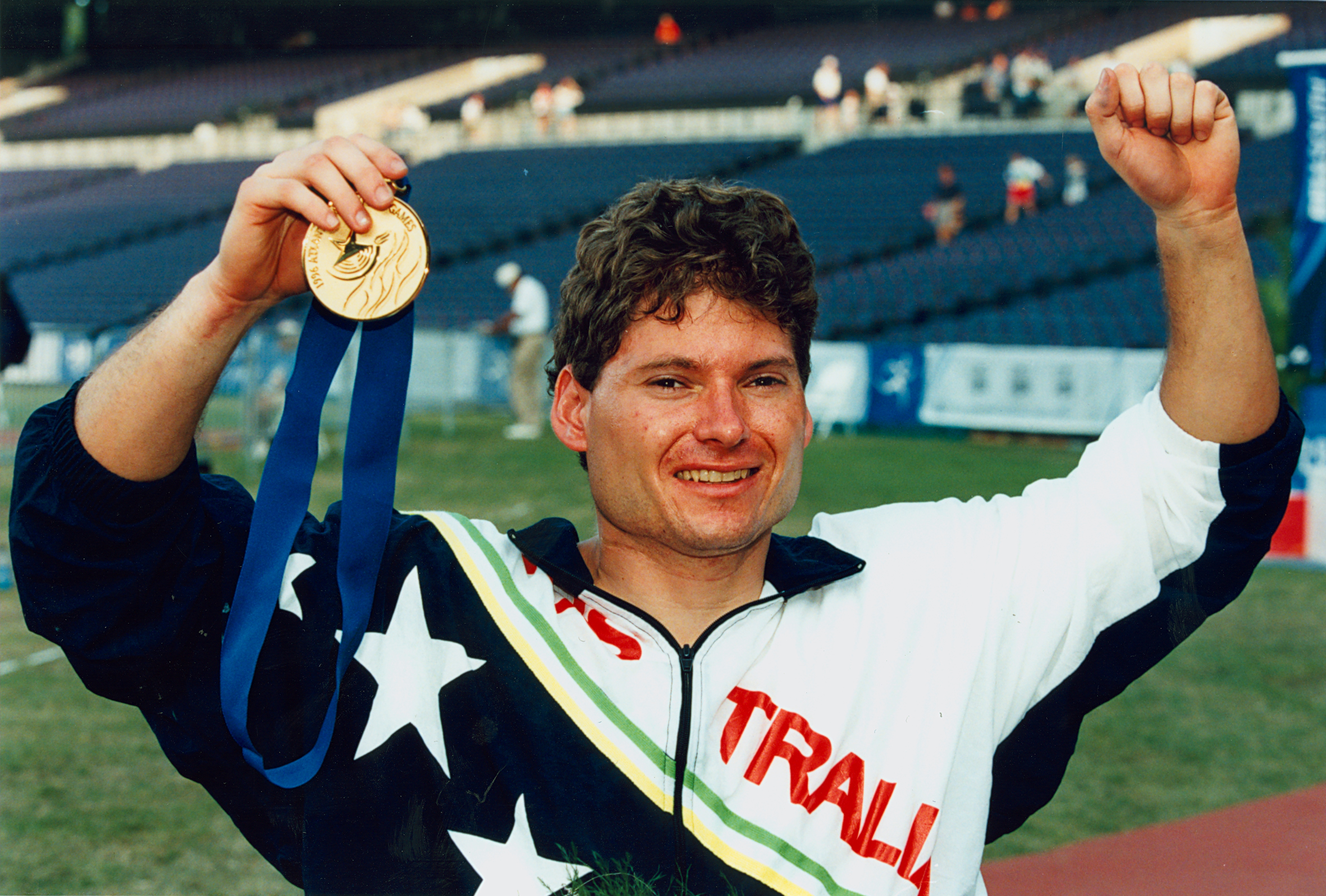
- John Lindsay showing the gold medal he won in the T52 100m event at the 1996 Paralympics.

Personal information
- Nationality: Australia
- Born: 29 January 1970 (age 56) Melbourne, Australia
Medal record
Men's para athletics
Representing Australia
Paralympic Games
Gold medal – first place	1992 Barcelona	200 m TW3
Gold medal – first place	1996 Atlanta	100 m T52
Gold medal – first place	2000 Sydney	100 m T53
Silver medal – second place	1992 Barcelona	100 m TW3
Silver medal – second place	1996 Atlanta	200 m T52
Silver medal – second place	2000 Sydney	4x100 m Relay T54
Bronze medal – third place	1992 Barcelona	400 m TW3
Bronze medal – third place	1996 Atlanta	400 m T52
Bronze medal – third place	2000 Sydney	200 m T53
World Championships
Silver medal – second place	1994 Berlin	200 m T52
Silver medal – second place	1998 Birmingham	100 m T54
Silver medal – second place	1998 Birmingham	200 m T54
Silver medal – second place	2002 Lille	100 m T53
Bronze medal – third place	1994 Berlin	100 m T52

John Lindsay, OAM (born 29 January 1970) is an Australian Paralympic athlete from Melbourne. He competed in the 1988 Seoul games in distances ranging from 100 m to 800 m, but did not win any medals. At the 1992 Barcelona Games, he won a gold medal in the Men's 200 m TW3 event, for which he received a Medal of the Order of Australia, a silver medal in the Men's 100 m TW3 event and a bronze medal in the Men's 400 m TW3 event. That year, he had a Victorian Institute of Sport scholarship. He was also working as a fitness instructor in 1992, held world records in the 100 m and 200 m events, and was ranked 6th in the world in the 400 m. He won a gold medal in the men's athletics 100 m T52 event at the 1996 Summer Paralympics with a time of 15.22, a silver medal in the 200 m T52 event with a time of 27.38, and a bronze medal in the 400 m T52 event with a time of 52.93. At the 2000 Sydney Games, he won a gold medal in the Men's 100 m T53 event, a silver medal as part of the Men's 4x100 m Relay T54 team, and a bronze medal in the Men's 200 m T53 event; he was also part of the Men's 4x400 m Relay T54 team, which was the only one to qualify in its heat, but it did not make it to the finals. At the 2004 Athens Games, he came seventh in the first round of the Men's 100 m T53 event and sixth in the third round of the Men's 200 m T53 event. He was an Australian Institute of Sport scholarship holder in 1995 and 2000.

In 1996, Kingston City Council created the John Lindsay Reserve in Patterson Lakes, Victoria. In 2000, he received an Australian Sports Medal.
