= David Goodman (athlete) =

Australian Paralympic athlete (born 1958)

Personal information
- Nationality: Australia
- Born: 31 August 1958 (age 67)
Medal record
Men's para athletics
Representing Australia
Paralympic Games
Gold medal – first place	1988 Seoul	100 m B3

David Goodman (born 31 August 1958) is an Australian Paralympic athlete with a vision impairment born in London, England. He participated but did not win a medal at the 1984 New York/Stoke Mandeville Games. He won a gold medal at the 1988 Seoul Games in the Men's 100 m B3 event. He also participated but did not win any medals at the 1992 Barcelona and 1996 Atlanta Games. He also played blind cricket, and was in the Australian team for the Blind World Cup in 1998.
