= Brian Harvey (Australian athlete) =

Australian Paralympic athlete

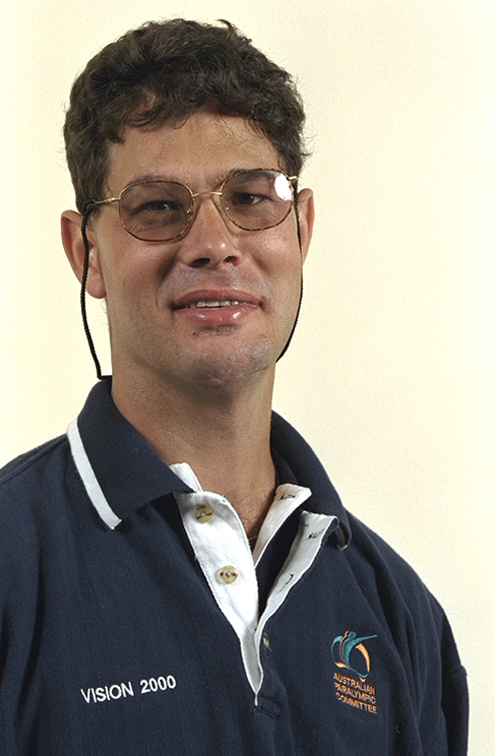
- 2000 Australian Paralympic team portrait of Harvey

Personal information
- Full name: Brian Harry Harvey
- Nationality: Australia
- Born: 3 October 1965 (age 60) Rockhampton, Australia
Medal record
Men's para athletics
Representing Australia
Paralympic Games
Gold medal – first place	1996 Atlanta	Javelin F34/37
Bronze medal – third place	2000 Sydney	Discus Throw F38
World Championships
Silver medal – second place	1994 Berlin	Javelin F37
Bronze medal – third place	1994 Berlin	Shot Put F37

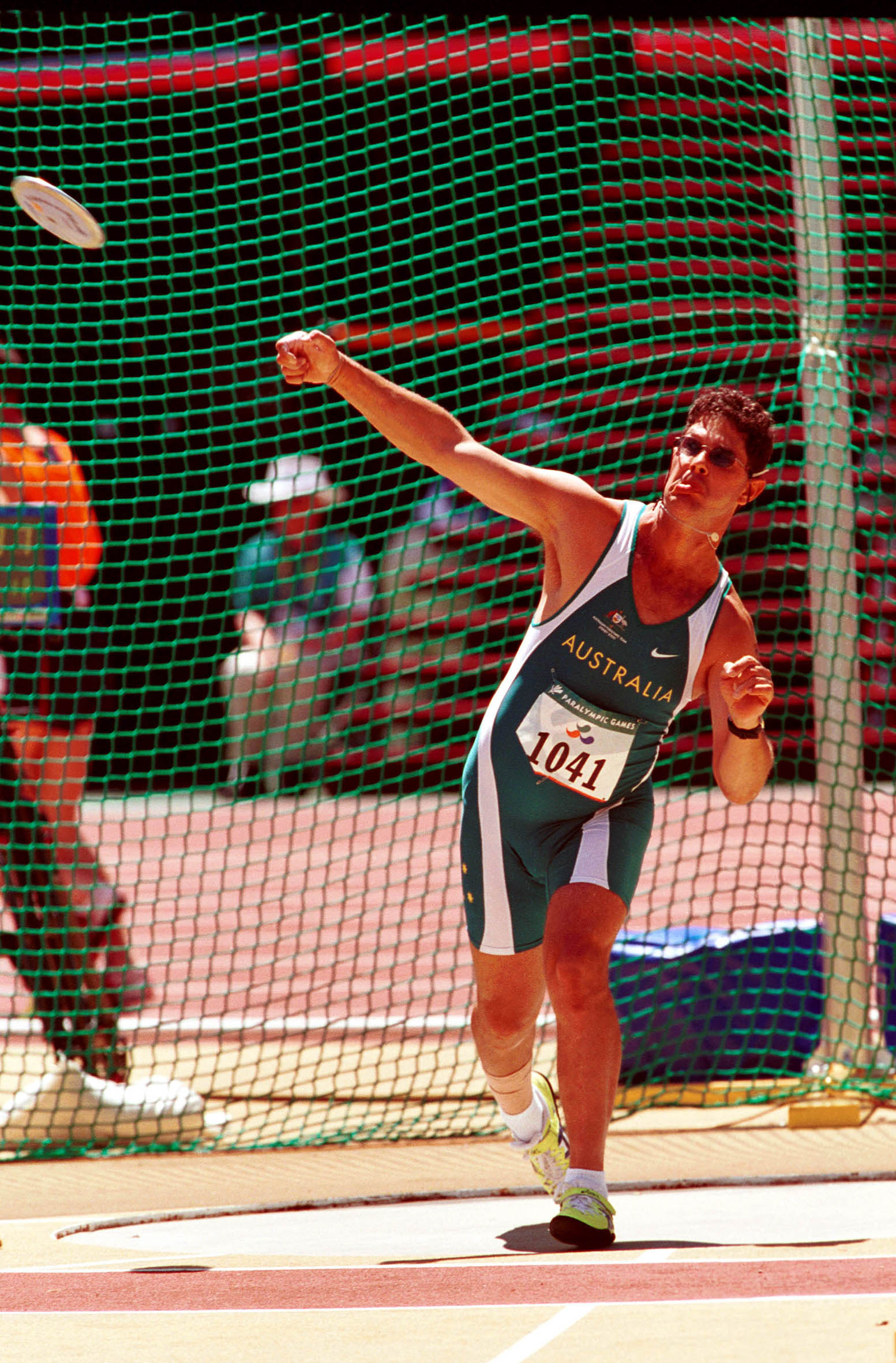
Action shot of Harvey during discus F38 competition at the 2000 Sydney Paralympics. He won bronze in this event.

Brian Harry Harvey, OAM (born 3 October 1965) is an Australian Paralympic athlete. He was born in the Queensland city of Rockhampton, and has cerebral palsy. At the 1996 Atlanta Games, he won a gold medal in the Men's Javelin F34/37 event, for which he received a Medal of the Order of Australia. He won a bronze medal at the 2000 Sydney Games in the Men's Discus Throw F38 event. That year, he received an Australian Sports Medal. He participated in the 2004 Athens Games, but did not win any medals at that competition.
