= Stephen Eaton =

Australian Paralympic athlete (born 1975)

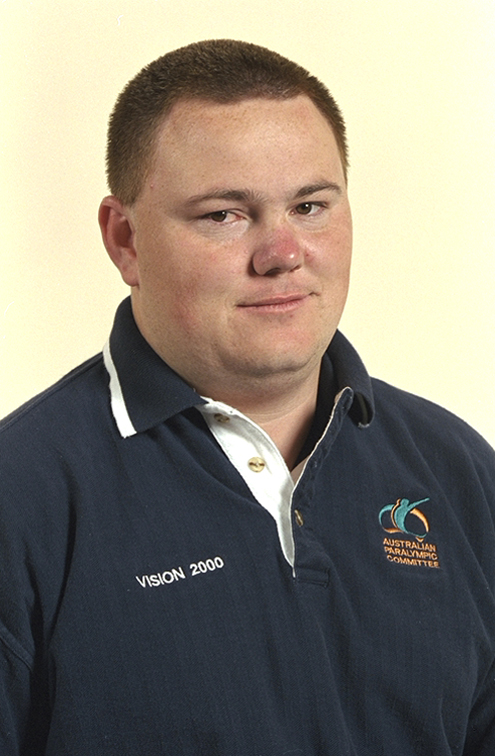
- 2000 Australian Paralympic team portrait of Eaton

Personal information
- Full name: Stephen Robert Eaton
- Nationality: Australia
- Born: 15 September 1975 (age 50) Toowoomba, Queensland
Medal record
Wheelchair athletics
Paralympic Games
Bronze medal – third place	1996 Atlanta	Men's Discus F32–33
Gold medal – first place	2000 Sydney	Men's Discus F34
IPC World Championships
Silver medal – second place	1998 Birmingham	Men's Discus F34
Bronze medal – third place	2002 Lille	Men's Shot-put F33-34

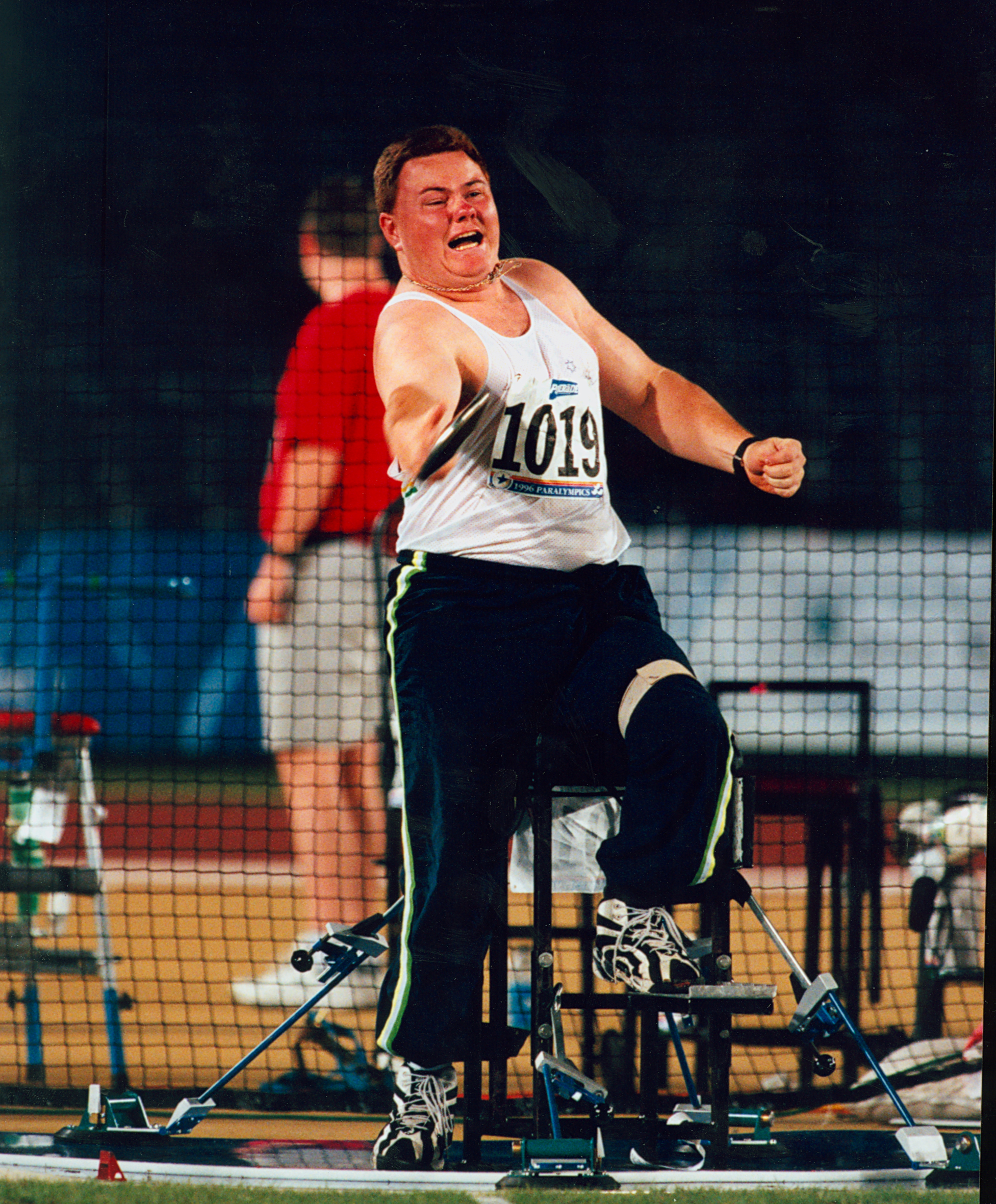
Eaton seen during discus competition at the 1996 Atlanta Paralympics

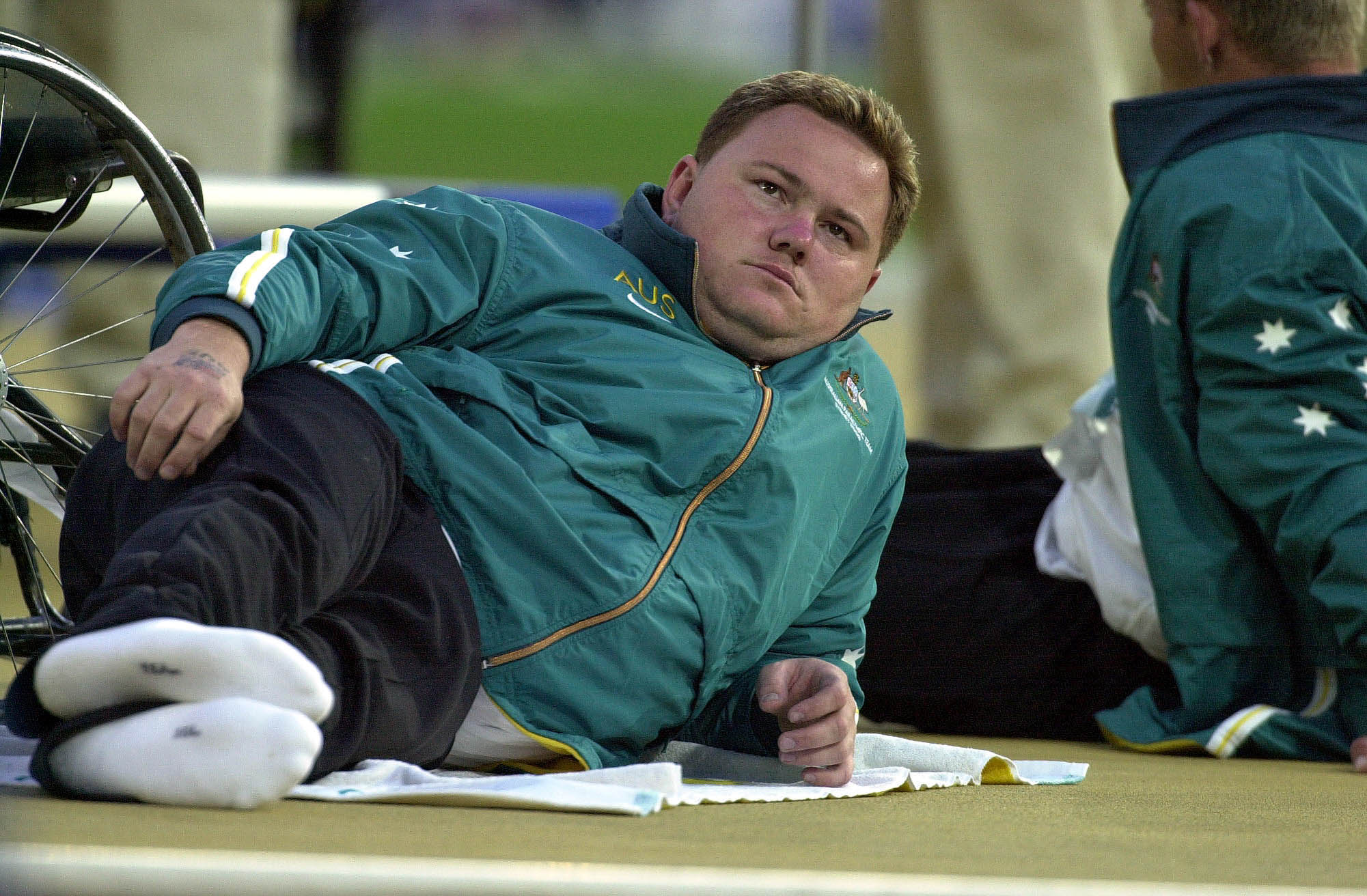
Eaton relaxes on the grass during the discus F34 final at the 2000 Sydney Paralympics

Stephen Robert Eaton, OAM (born 15 September 1975) is an Australian athlete with cerebral palsy from Toowoomba, Queensland who competes at the national and international level in discus throwing and shot put at events such as the Paralympic Games and IPC Athletics World Championships.

Eaton first began to participate in track and field events at the age of eight, under the guidance of coach Anne Marsh. He represented Australia at a Paralympic level for the first time in 1993, and won two gold medals at the 1994 FESPIC Games. He won a bronze medal in the Men's Discus F32–33 event at the 1996 Atlanta Paralympics. He won a silver medal in the men's discus at the 1998 IPC Athletics World Championships. He had an Australian Institute of Sport Athletics with a Disability scholarship from 1997 to 2000. He was also supported by the Queensland Academy of Sport.

He won a gold medal at the 2000 Summer Paralympics in the men's discus F34 event, for which he received a Medal of the Order of Australia. In 2000, he received an Australian Sports Medal.

Eaton has highlighted the therapeutic value of sport for anyone with a disability. He commented "If I didn't play sport I don't know what I would do. I get to meet people and to travel."
