= Andrew Dawes (coach) =

Personal information
- Nationality: Australia
- Born: 30 September 1969 (age 57) Orange, New South Wales

Sport
- Sport: Wheelchair racing
- Now coaching: Head Coach of the NSWIS Wheelchair Track & Road Program

Andrew John Dawes is an Australian seven time Paralympic wheelchair coach. He has coached Australian athletes to 19 gold medals at Paralympic Games. Including Louise Sauvage, Kurt Fearnley and Greg Smith. He currently is the New South Wales Institute of Sport (NSWIS) Wheelchair Track and Road head coach.

== Personal ==
Dawes was born on 30 September 1969 in Orange, New South Wales. He is married to Paralympic athlete Christie Dawes who he also coaches. They have a son who was born in 2011.

== Coaching career ==
Dawes began his career as a physical education teacher. He went on to become a coach for the Australian wheelchair track and road team at the 1996 Paralympics. In the 1998 IPC World Track and Field Championships, Dawes was named as the national team coach. He has gone on to coach several successful athletes including Louise Sauvage, Greg Smith and Fabian Blattman.

He has attended four successive Summer Paralympics from 2000-2012 as an assistant coach and as a coach. In the 2004 Summer Paralympics Dawes coached Kurt Fearnley to success where he won gold. Additionally, his wife Christie won silver in the 4 × 100 m relay team at the 2008 Summer Paralympics In 2012 three of Dawes' athletes, Christie Dawes, Kurt Fearnley and Rosemary Little, participated in the 2012 Summer Paralympics. Where Christie won bronze, Fearnley won silver and bronze and Little won bronze. Currently, Dawes is the head coach of the NSWIS Wheelchair Track & Road Program.

== Recognition ==
In 2014 Dawes was awarded a Medal of the Order of Australia for service to athletics as a wheelchair track and road coach.
