= Amanda Fraser =

Australian Paralympic athlete and swimmer

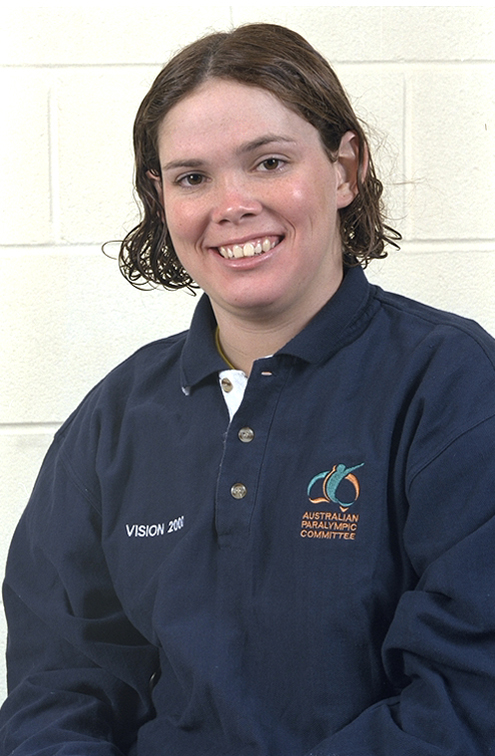
- 2000 Australian Paralympic team portrait of Fraser

Personal information
- Full name: Amanda Fraser
- Nationality: Australia
- Born: 10 November 1981 (age 45) Emerald, Queensland
- Height: 177 cm (5 ft 10 in)
- Weight: 70 kg (154 lb)
Medal record
Representing Australia
Event	1st	2nd	3rd
Paralympic Games	0	2	2
IPC Swimming World Championships	0	1	1
IPC Athletics World Championships	1	1	0
Total	1	4	3
Swimming
Paralympic Games
Bronze medal – third place	2000 Sydney	Women's 4×100m 34 points
Bronze medal – third place	2000 Sydney	Women's 50m Freestyle S7
IPC Swimming World Championships
Silver medal – second place	1998 Christchurch	Women's 4 x 100m Freestyle Open
Bronze medal – third place	1998 Christchurch	Women's 200 m Individual Medley SM7
Athletics
Paralympic Games
Silver medal – second place	2004 Athens	Women's Discus F37
Silver medal – second place	2008 Beijing	Women's Discus F37-38
IPC Athletics World Championships
Gold medal – first place	2006 Assen	Women's Discus F37
Silver medal – second place	2006 Assen	Women's Shot Put F37
Bronze medal – third place	2002 Lille	Women's Discus F37-38

Amanda Fraser (born 10 November 1981 in Emerald, Queensland) is an Australian Paralympic athlete and swimmer. She has cerebral palsy and competes in the F37 category for the physically impaired. Competing in the 2000, 2004, and 2008 Summer Paralympics, she won two silver and two bronze medals, and in the 2006 World Championships, she won a gold and a silver medal. In the 2006 championships, she set a world record for discus in her classification, and was named 2006 Telstra Female AWD Athlete of the Year by Athletics Australia. Fraser now works as a personal trainer, working with people unfamiliar to a gym environment, especially women. She advocates for women empowerment and aims to help women develop their mental and physical strength.

== Career ==
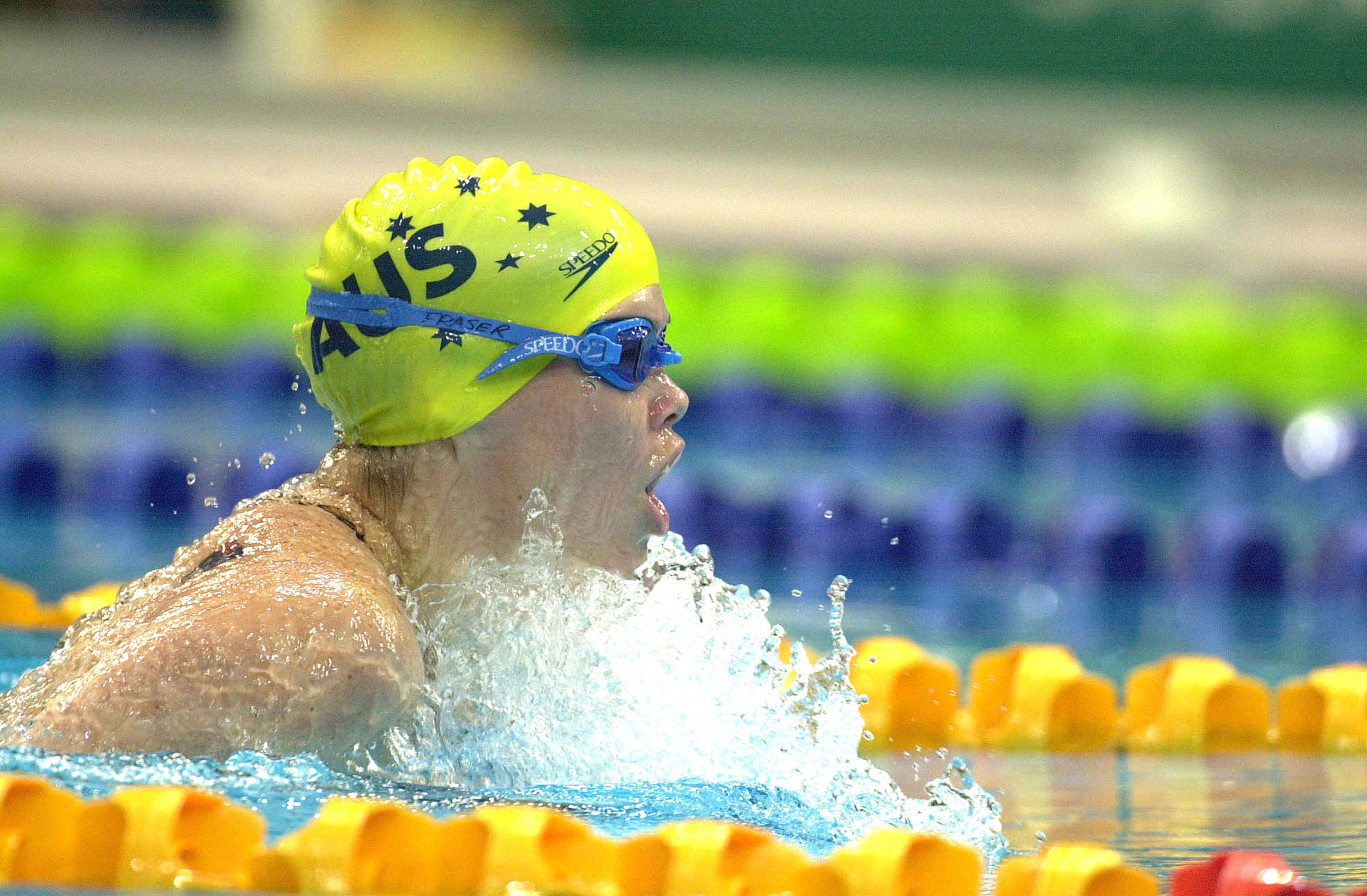
Fraser in the pool during the 200 m medley S7 at the 2000 Summer Paralympics

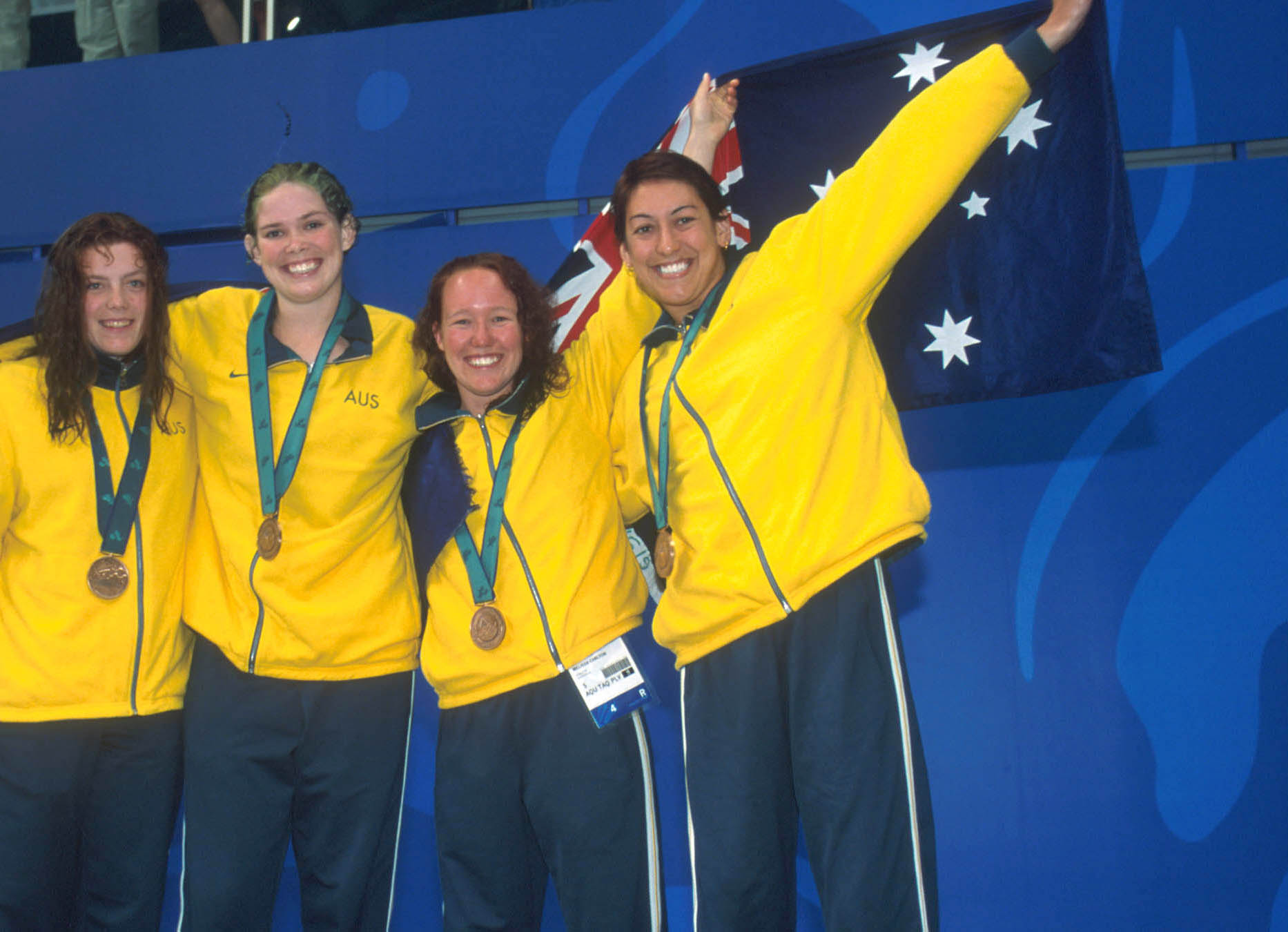
Fraser, seen second from left with the bronze medal-winning Australian Women's 4 x 100 m freestyle 34pts team at the 2000 Summer Paralympics. From left to right: Gemma Dashwood, Amanda Fraser, Melissa Carlton and Priya Cooper

Fraser was born with spastic hemiplegia, a form of cerebral palsy where one side of the body is affected. At the age of 12, she competed in the Queensland School Sports Athletics Championships and won three gold medals. She later moved on to swimming, and was selected to complete in the 2000 Summer Paralympics in Sydney, where she won bronze medals in the 4×100 m Freestyle 34-point relay and the S7 50 m Freestyle.

In 2001, she returned to athletics, and qualified for the 2004 Summer Paralympics with a world-record discus throw of 27.95 m at the national championships. At the Paralympics, she competed in the 100 m, shot-put, and discus events, winning a silver medal in the F37 discus classification, Australia's first medal in athletics at the event.

She competed in the 2006 International Paralympic Committee World Championships, where she broke the F37 discus world record with a throw of 29.93 metres, winning the gold medal at the event. Following this achievement, she was named the 2006 Telstra Female Athlete with a Disability of the Year by Athletics Australia.

At the 2008 Paralympic Games in Beijing, Fraser was initially awarded the bronze medal for the discus in the combined F37–38 event; however, she was given the silver medal when British athlete Rebecca Chin was disqualified on the basis that she was ineligible to compete in the cerebral palsy category. It was initially reported by ABC News that Fraser refused to shake Chin's hand after the event, however this was later corrected by The Australian when it was found that it was not Fraser who refused to shake hands, but British athlete Beverly Jones. She was an Australian Institute of Sport athletics scholarship holder from 2002 to 2008.
