= Murray Goldfinch =

Australian Paralympic athlete (born 1984)

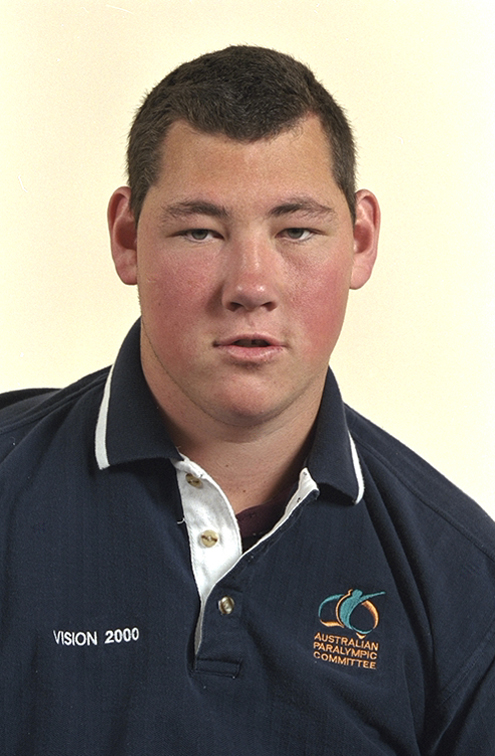
- 2000 Australian Paralympic team portrait of Goldfinch

Personal information
- Nationality: Australia
- Born: 16 March 1984 (age 42) Sydney, New South Wales
Medal record
Athletics
Paralympic Games
Bronze medal – third place	2000 Sydney	Men's Shot Put F20

Murray Goldfinch (born 16 March 1984 in Sydney, New South Wales) is a Paralympic athletics competitor with an intellectual disability from Canberra, Australia. He won a bronze medal at the 2000 Sydney Games in the men's shot put F20 event. In 2001, he held an Australian Institute of Sport athletics scholarship.
