= Oz Day 10K Wheelchair Road Race =

Oz Day 10K Wheelchair Road Race is held on Australia Day in The Rocks and is marquee event on the international wheelchair racing calendar, attracting prominent international and Australian athletes.

== History ==
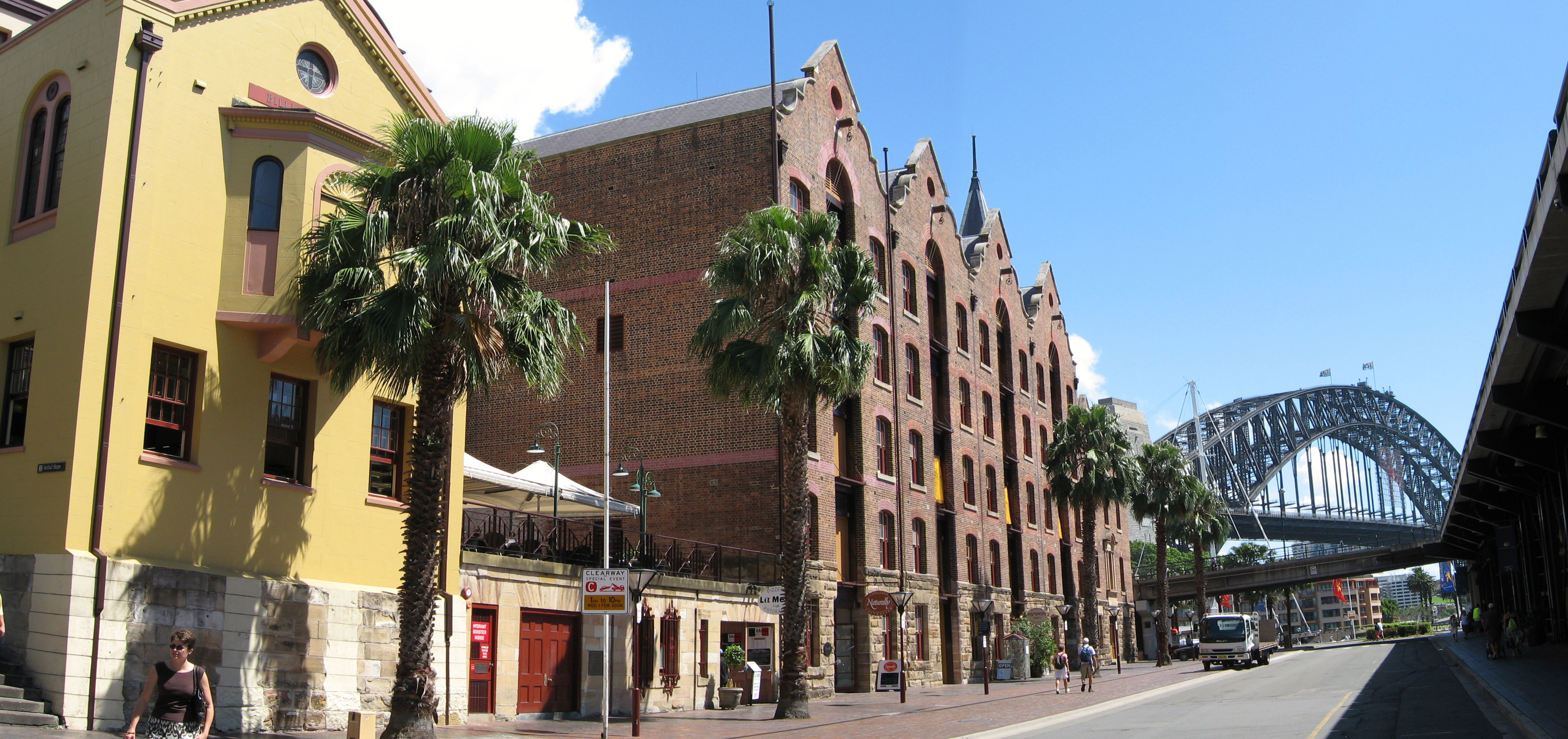
Sydney Rocks precinct where the annual OZ Day race is held

The inaugural race was held in 1990 around Centennial Park in Sydney amongst traffic travelling around the Park. The inaugural race was the brainchild of Peter Trotter and Jeff Wiseman, two prominent wheelchair racers that trained at the Park. Trotter a former 10 km road racing champion had competed in similar events throughout the world. Their philosophy in creating the event was for disabled children to see elite wheelchair athletes in competition. Sixty five athletes including sixteen international and eighteen interstate athletes competed. Australian cricketer Mike Whitney started the race and New South Wales Premier Nick Greiner and record breaking aviator Gaby Kennard presented the winners prizes which included prize money. Over one thousand spectators watched the event.

The race was moved to The Rocks area in 1991 and consisted of two 5 km laps. Over the years, the organisers have encountered difficulties as major city roads need to be closed. The race in normally held early in the morning to overcome the difficulties of road closures.

The race is supported by the Australia Day Council and Sydney City Council and managed by Wheelchair Sports NSW. It is now an iconic event in Sydney on Australia Day.

== Results ==
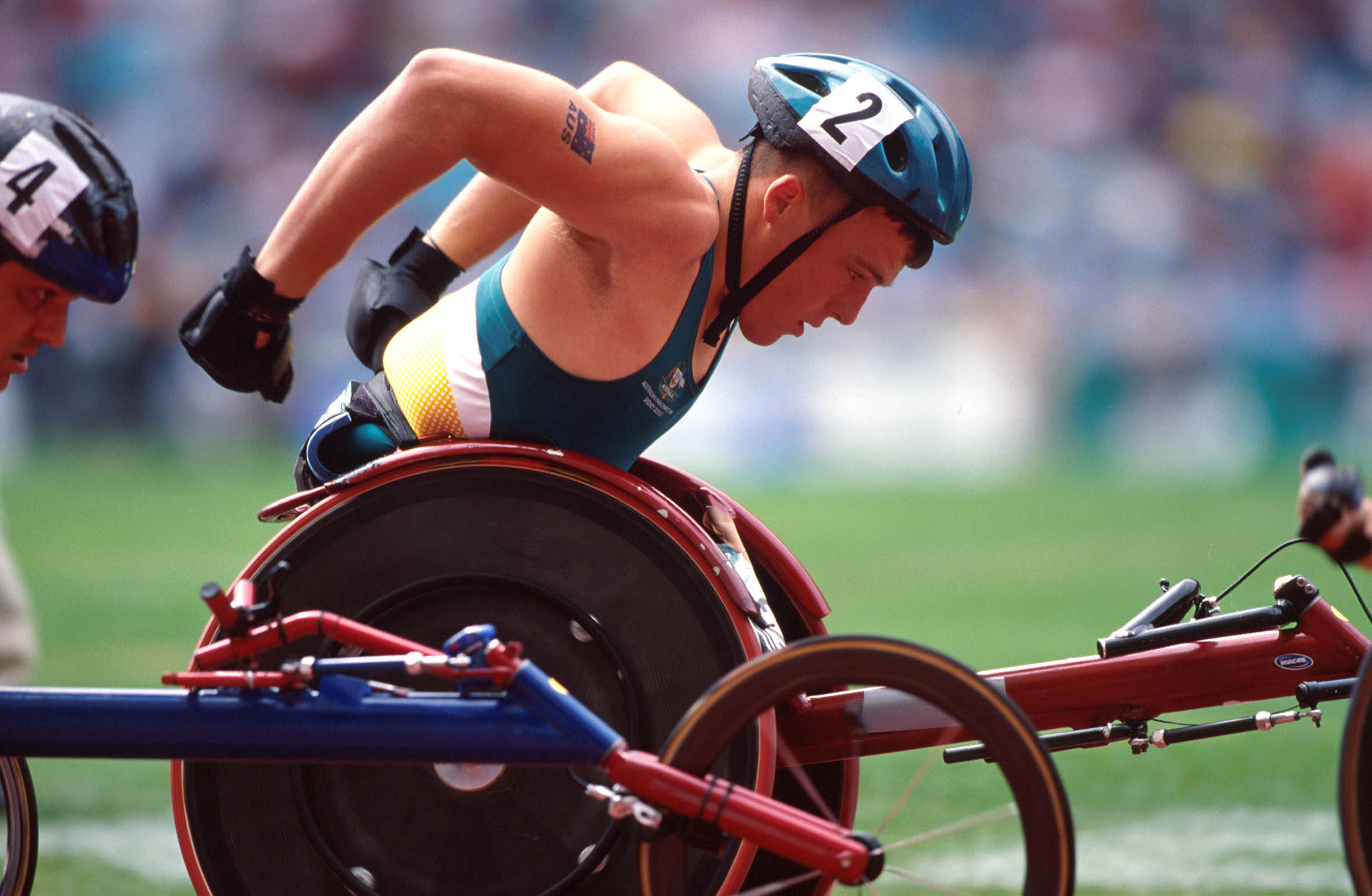
Kurt Fearnley racing at the Sydney Paralympics – a ten times winner of OZ Day 10k Wheelchair race

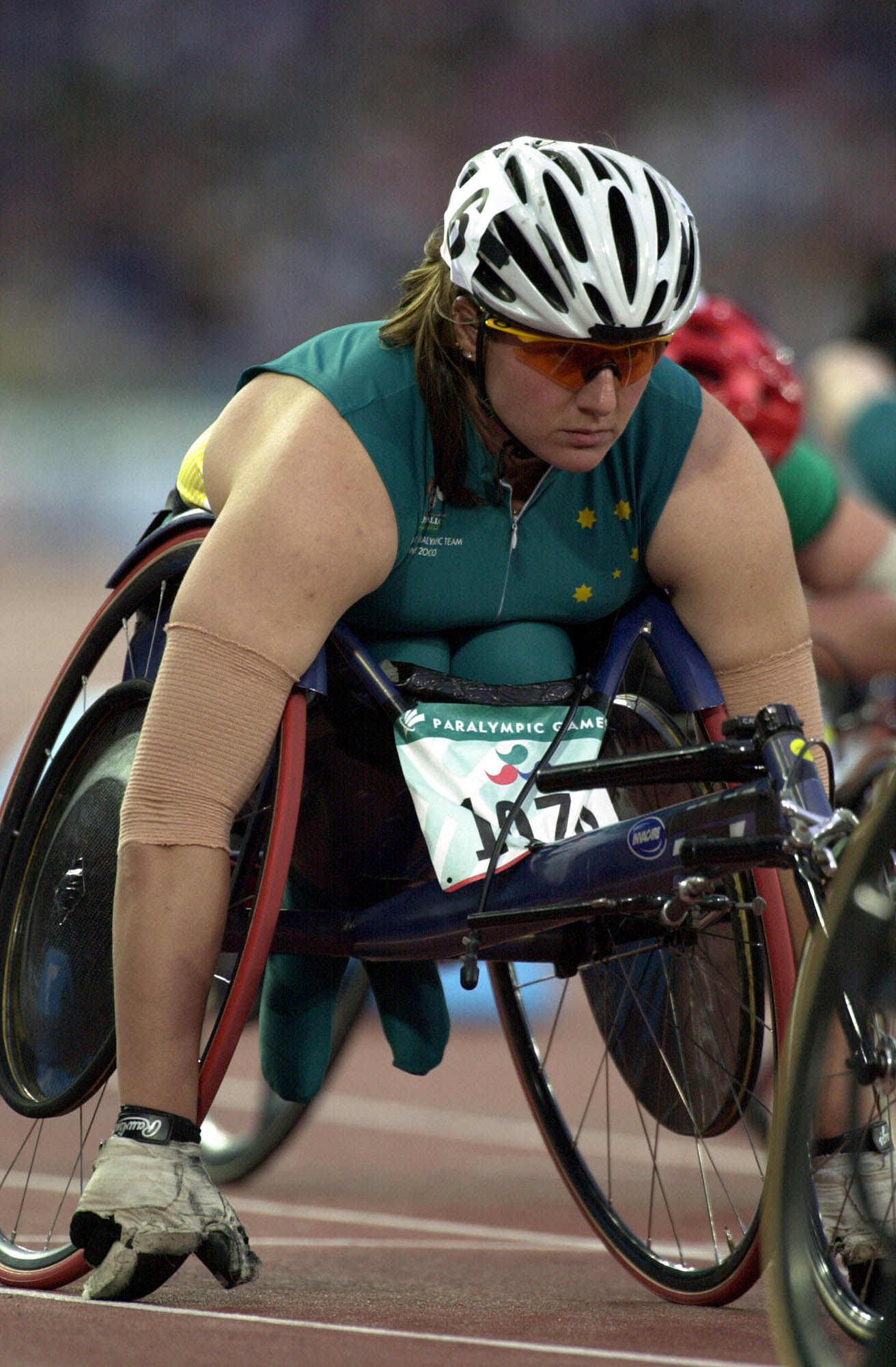
Louise Sauvage racing at the Sydney Paralympics – a ten times winner of OZ Day 10k Wheelchair race

Prominent international and Australian athletes have competed in the event and prize money is awarded. At the completion of the 2026 event, Madison de Rosario had won the race twelve times, Kurt Fearnley eleven times and Louise Sauvage ten times.

=== Senior Events ===
Year	Men's Open Event	Women's Event	Men's T51-53 Event	Women's T51-53 Event	Men's T51 Event
1990	Craig Blanchette United States	Ingrid Lauridsen Denmark	Jan Owe-Mattson Sweden	Not held	Heinrich Koberle Germany
1991	Craig Blanchette United States	Jennette Jansen Netherlands	Jeff Worthington United States	Not held	Heinrich Koberle Germany
1992	Franz Nietlispach Switzerland	Barbara Maier Germany	Rick Reelie Canada	Not held	Fabian Blattman Australia
1993	Jim Knaub United States	Louise Sauvage Australia	Clayton Gerein Canada	Not held	Heinrich Koberle Germany
1994	Paul Wiggins Australia	Louise Sauvage Australia	Clayton Gerein Canada	Not held	Heinrich Koberle Germany
1995	Paul Wiggins Australia	Louise Sauvage Australia	Rick Reelie Canada	Not held	Fabian Blattman Australia
1996	Paul Wiggins Australia	Louise Sauvage Australia	Clayton Gerein Canada	Not held	Fabian Blattman Australia
1997	Jeff Adams Canada	Louise Sauvage Australia	Clayton Gerein Canada	Not held	Fabian Blattman Australia
1998	Claude Issorat France	Louise Sauvage Australia	Rick Reelie Canada	Not held	Fabian Blattman Australia
1999	Heinz Frei Switzerland	Louise Sauvage Australia	Rick Reelie Canada	Not held	Fabian Blattman Australia
2000	Ernst van Dyk South Africa	Wakako Tsuchida Japan	Clayton Gerein Canada	Not held	Fabian Blattman Australia
2001	Ernst van Dyk South Africa	Louise Sauvage Australia	Clayton Gerein Canada	Not held	Fabian Blattman Australia
2002	Saúl Mendoza Mexico	Louise Sauvage Australia	Rick Reelie Canada	Not held	Fabian Blattman Australia
2003	Ernst van Dyk South Africa	Louise Sauvage Australia	Clayton Gerein Canada	Not held	Heinrich Koberle Germany
2004	Saúl Mendoza Mexico	Eliza Stankovic Australia	Clayton Gerein Canada	Lisa Franks Canada	Heinrich Koberle Germany
2005	Kurt Fearnley Australia	Eliza Stankovic Australia	Santiago Sanz Spain	No competitor	Heinrich Koberle Germany
2006	Kurt Fearnley Australia	Eliza Stankovic Australia	Santiago Sanz Spain	Sybilla Austin Australia	Glenn Bennett Australia
2007	Kurt Fearnley Australia	Chantal Petitclerc Canada	Santiago Sanz Spain	No competitor	Glenn Bennett Australia
2008	Kurt Fearnley Australia	Edith Hunkeler Switzerland	Peter Angel Australia	Michelle Stilwell Canada	No competitor
2009	Kurt Fearnley Australia	Christie Dawes Australia	Clayton Gerein Canada	Michelle Stilwell Canada	No competitor
2010	Kurt Fearnley Australia	Edith Hunkeler Switzerland	Santiago Sanz Spain	Michelle Stilwell Canada	Richard Cordukes Australia
2011	Kurt Fearnley Australia	Sandra Rush United States	Peter Angel Australia	No competitor	No competitor
2012	Kurt Fearnley Australia	Madison de Rozario Australia	Santiago Sanz Spain	Michelle Stilwell Canada	Stephen Osborne United Kingdom
2013	Kurt Fearnley Australia	Madison de Rozario Australia	Naoyuki Matsumoto Japan	Michelle Stilwell Canada	No competitor
2014	David Weir United Kingdom	Manuela Schar Switzerland	Naoyuki Matsumoto Japan	Michelle Stilwell Canada	Stephen Osborne United Kingdom
2015	Kota Hokinoue Japan	Manuela Schar Switzerland	Jono Tang Australia	Michelle Stilwell Canada	No competitor
2016	Kurt Fearnley Australia	Manuela Schar Switzerland	Jono Tang Australia	Michelle Stilwell Canada	No competitor
2017	Kurt Fearnley Australia	Madison de Rozario Australia	Naoyuki Matsumoto Japan	-	–
2018	Tomoki Suzuki Japan	Madison de Rozario Australia	Naoyuki Matsumoto Japan	–	-
2019	Tomoki Suzuki Japan	Madison de Rozario Australia	Naoyuki Matsumoto Japan	–	-
2020	Tomoki Suzuki Japan	Madison de Rozario Australia	-	-	-
2021	Jake Lappin Australia	Madison de Rozario Australia	Jono Tang Australia	-	-
2022	Jake Lappin Australia	Madison de Rozario Australia	Jono TangAustralia	-	-
2023	Sam Rizzo Australia	Madison de Rozario Australia	Jono Tang Australia	Sarah Clifton-BlighAustralia	-
2024	Sho Watanabe Japan	Madison de Rozario Australia	Jono Tang Australia	Sarah Clifton-BlighAustralia	-
2025	Sam Rizzo Australia	Madison de Rozario Australia	Jono Tang Australia	Sarah Clifton-BlighAustralia	-
2026	Sam Rizzo Australia	Madison de Rozario Australia	Cristian Eduardo Torres Ortiz Colombia	Sarah Clifton-BlighAustralia	No longer held

- Men's T52, Women's T52 and Men's T51 events held until 2025. From 2026, T52 / T51 replaced by T51-53 events for men and women.

=== Junior and Masters Events ===
Year	Junior Male U18/9	Junior Female U18/99	Masters
1990	Paul Nunnari Australia	Not held	Mike Nugent Australia
1991	Eric Neitzel United States	Not held	Mike Nugent Australia
1992	Eric Neitzel United States	Not held	Paul Bowes Australia
1993	Eric Neitzel United States	Not held	Paul Bowes Australia
1994	Shannon Bates Australia	Not held	Mike Nugent Australia
1995	Shannon Bates Australia	Kerstin Rossek Germany	Jeff Wiseman Australia
1996	Todd Burmester Australia	Christie Skelton Australia	Steve Ellefson Canada
1997	Todd Burmester Australia	Christie Skelton Australia	Steve Ellefson Canada
1998	Todd Burmester Australia	Christie Skelton Australia	Steve Ellefson Canada
1999	Kurt Fearnley Australia	Holly Ladmore Australia	Steve Ellefson Canada
2000	Adam Sheppard Australia	Kylie Gauci Australia	Scott Parson United States
2001	Grant Buckley Australia	Angie Ballard Australia	Scott Parson United States
2002	Grant Buckley Australia	Jessica Matassa Canada	Scott Parson United States
2003	Marcel Hug Switzerland	Jessica Matassa Canada	Henri Frei Switzerland
2004	Marcel Hug Switzerland	Jessica Matassa Canada	Henri Frei Switzerland
2005	Patrick Baker Australia	Kelly Darragh Australia	Kenny Herriot Scotland
2006	Patrick Baker Australia	Kelly Darragh Australia	Kenny Herriot Scotland
2007	Xaxier Elsworthy Australia	Laura South Australia	Brett McArthur Australia
2008	Matthew Lack New Zealand	Madison de Rozario Australia	Denis Lemeunier France
2009	Matthew Lack New Zealand	Madison de Rozario Australia	Brett McArthur Australia
2010	Matthew Lack New Zealand	Madison de Rozario Australia	Scott Parson United States
2011	Nathan Arkley Australia	No competitor	Heinz Frei Switzerland
2012	Nathan Arkley Australia	Kristy Pond Australia	Scott Parson United States
2013	Rheed McCracken Australia	Sara Tait Australia	Pierre Fairbank France
2014	Rheed McCracken Australia	Sara Tait Australia	Pierre Fairbank France
2015	Luke Bailey Australia	Julie Charlton Australia	Ernest van Dyck South Africa
2016	Brad Pemberton Australia	Julie Charlton Australia	Pierre Fairbank France
2017	Sam Rizzo Australia	Julie Charlton Australia	Kota Hokinoue Japan
2018	Sam Rizzo Australia	No competitor	Kota Hokinoue Japan
2019	Nathan Donaldson Australia	Victoria Simpson Australia	Kota Hokinoue Japan
2020	Cory Crombie Australia	Victoria Simpson Australia	Pierre Fairbank France
2021	Cormac Ryan Australia	Sarah Clifton Bligh Australia	Paul Nunnari Australia
2022	Cormac Ryan Australia	No competitor	Paul Nunnari Australia
2023	Cormac Ryan Australia	No competitor	Jun Hiromichi Japan
2024	Cormac Ryan Australia	Coco Espie Australia	Paul Nunnari Australia
2025	Lachlan Reid Australia	Coco Espie Australia	Paul Nunnari Australia
2026	Lachlan Reid Australia	Coco Espie Australia	Hitoshi Matsunaga Japan

- 2021 event entries impacted by COVID-19 international and interstate restrictions.
