= Athletics at the 2022 Commonwealth Games – Men's marathon (T54) =

Men's marathon (T54) at the 2022 Commonwealth Games
- Dates: 30 July
- Competitors: 8 from 6 nations
- Winning time: 1:41:15

Medalists
gold medal	John Charles Smith	England
silver medal	Sean Frame	Scotland
bronze medal	Simon Lawson	England

The men's marathon (T54) at the 2022 Commonwealth Games, as part of the athletics programme, was held in Birmingham on 30 July 2022.

== Records ==
Prior to this competition, the existing world and Games records were as follows:

Records T54
World record	Marcel Hug (SUI)	1:17:47	Ōita, Japan	21 November 2021
Games record	Kurt Fearnley (AUS)	1:30:26	Gold Coast, Australia	15 April 2018

== Schedule ==
The schedule was as follows:

Date	Time	Round
Saturday 30 July 2022	07:00	Final

All times are British Summer Time (UTC+1)

== Results ==
The results of the marathon race are given below:-

Rank	Name	Sport class	Result	Notes
1st place, gold medalist(s)	John Charles Smith (ENG)	T54	1:41:15	
2nd place, silver medalist(s)	Sean Frame (SCO)	T54	1:45:49	SB
3rd place, bronze medalist(s)	Simon Lawson (ENG)	T53	1:45:49	
4	Josh Cassidy (CAN)	T54	1:47:47	
5	Jake Lappin (AUS)	T54	1:56:21	
6	Mark Millar (NIR)	T54	1:58:48	PB
7	David Weir (ENG)	T54	2:05:08	SB
8	Tiaan Bosch (RSA)	T53	2:05:57	
