= Athletics at the 2018 Commonwealth Games – Men's marathon (T54) =

Men's marathon (T54) at the 2018 Commonwealth Games
- Venue: Southport Broadwater Parklands
- Dates: 15 April
- Competitors: 9 from 4 nations
- Winning time: 1:30:26 GR

Medalists
gold medal	Kurt Fearnley	Australia
silver medal	Johnboy Smith	England
bronze medal	Simon Lawson	England

The men's marathon (T54) at the 2018 Commonwealth Games, as part of the athletics programme, was held in Southport Broadwater Parklands, Gold Coast on 15 April 2018. The event was open to para-sport athletes competing under the T53 / T54 classifications.

== Records ==
Prior to this competition, the existing world and Games records were as follows:

World record	Heinz Frei (Switzerland)	1:20:14 (T53/54)	Ōita, Japan	31 October 1999
Games record	Paul Wiggins (AUS)	1:37:33 (T54)	Victoria, Canada	1994

== Schedule ==
The schedule was as follows:

Date	Time	Round
Sunday 15 April 2018	6:10	Race

All times are Australian Eastern Standard Time (UTC+10)

== Results ==
The results were as follows:

Rank	Name	Sport Class	Result	Notes
1st place, gold medalist(s)	Kurt Fearnley (AUS)	T54	1:30:26	GR
2nd place, silver medalist(s)	Johnboy Smith (ENG)	T54	1:31:44	SB
3rd place, bronze medalist(s)	Simon Lawson (ENG)	T53	1:31:44	
4	Tristan Smyth (CAN)	T54	1:31:44	SB
5	Alex Dupont (CAN)	T54	1:36:44	
6	Jake Lappin (AUS)	T54	1:37:34	
7	Callum Hall (ENG)	T53	1:37:36	
8	Nkegbe Botsyo (GHA)	T54	1:56:56	
9	Felix Acheampong (GHA)	T54	1:57:54	SB
