= Richard Cordukes =

Australian Paralympic athlete

Personal information
- Nationality: Australia
Medal record
Men's para athletics
Representing Australia
Paralympic Games
Silver medal – second place	1988 Seoul	4x100 m 1A–1C
Bronze medal – third place	1988 Seoul	4x200 m 1A–1C

Richard Cordukes from New South Wales is an Australian Paralympic athlete. At the 1988 Seoul Paralympics, he won a silver medal in the Men's 4x100 m Relay 1A–1C event and a bronze medal in the Men's 4x200 m Relay 1A–1C event.

== Personal ==
Cordukes became a quadriplegic in 1976 and began participating in wheelchair sports the following year. He first represented New South Wales in 1979 at the National Wheelchair Games in Perth.

In September 2018, Cordukes spoke publicly about an incident at the railway station in Townsville where he was prevented from boarding Queensland Rail's long-distance Spirit of Queensland service. Cordukes intended to travel to Bundaberg for a friend's son's wedding, but was allegedly told by staff that he could only travel if he was accompanied by a carer. Staff also allegedly requested Cordukes demonstrate his physical abilities in an attempt to prove how independent he was. Despite this, Cordukes was not allowed to board the train, and was left on the platform as the train departed.

After speaking about the incident, an Inclusion Movement advocate criticised Queensland Rail for discriminating against a wheelchair user while Queensland's Transport Minister ordered an investigation. Cordukes also lodged a complaint with the Australian Human Rights Commission. Queensland Rail stated they contacted Cordukes to "discuss future travel with a carer" and to provide a refund.

On November 30th, 2024, Cordukes and fellow 1988 Paralympian Chris Sparks summited Mount Kosciuszko, raising over $47,000 for the Australian paralympic team.

== Sporting career ==
Cordukes competed in the Stoke Mandeville Games, which is now called the IWAS World Games in 1981, 1983, 1985 and 1987. It was in 1981 that Cordukes participated in the first-ever wheelchair rugby competition. Cordukes competed in the FESPIC Games in Hong Kong in 1982, before going on to break a world record in his category for the 100m at the Australian National Wheelchair Games in January 1986, which was later broken again by himself that year in Melbourne.

Cordukes won a silver and bronze medal at the 1988 Seoul Paralympics for the Men's 4 × 100 m 1A–1C and 4 × 200 m 1A–1C relays. Cordukes also competed in the 100m, where he came 7th with a time of 26.34 and finished 8th in the 200m final with a time of 53.90.

== Employment ==
In 1981, Cordukes became the part-time Executive Director of Wheelchair Sports NSW, before becoming president of the organisation in 1989 after serving 23 years with them. Cordukes fundraised for the Kevin Betts Stadium project at Mount Druitt and was involved with the Spinal Injuries Unit Awareness and Prevention Program at Royal North Shore Hospital, where he provided much needed support to patients for several years. The 24-hour Push-A-Thon was created by Cordukes in 1982 to raise money for wheelchair users. He organised funding subsidies for athletes wanting to attend the National Wheelchair Games and other overseas competitions.

== Recognition ==
In 2000, Cordukes was presented with the Australian Sports Medal and received the Legends status from Wheelchair Sports NSW at the 20th Anniversary of the Oz Day 10K Wheelchair Road Race, for his contributions to the event.

On 27 June 2011 Cordukes attended the Annual General Meeting of Wheelchair Sports NSW awards night where he was presented with the honour of being a Life Member of Wheelchair Sports NSW, after being an ambassador for the organisation for 50 years.
