= Paul Wiggins (athlete) =

Australian wheelchair racer

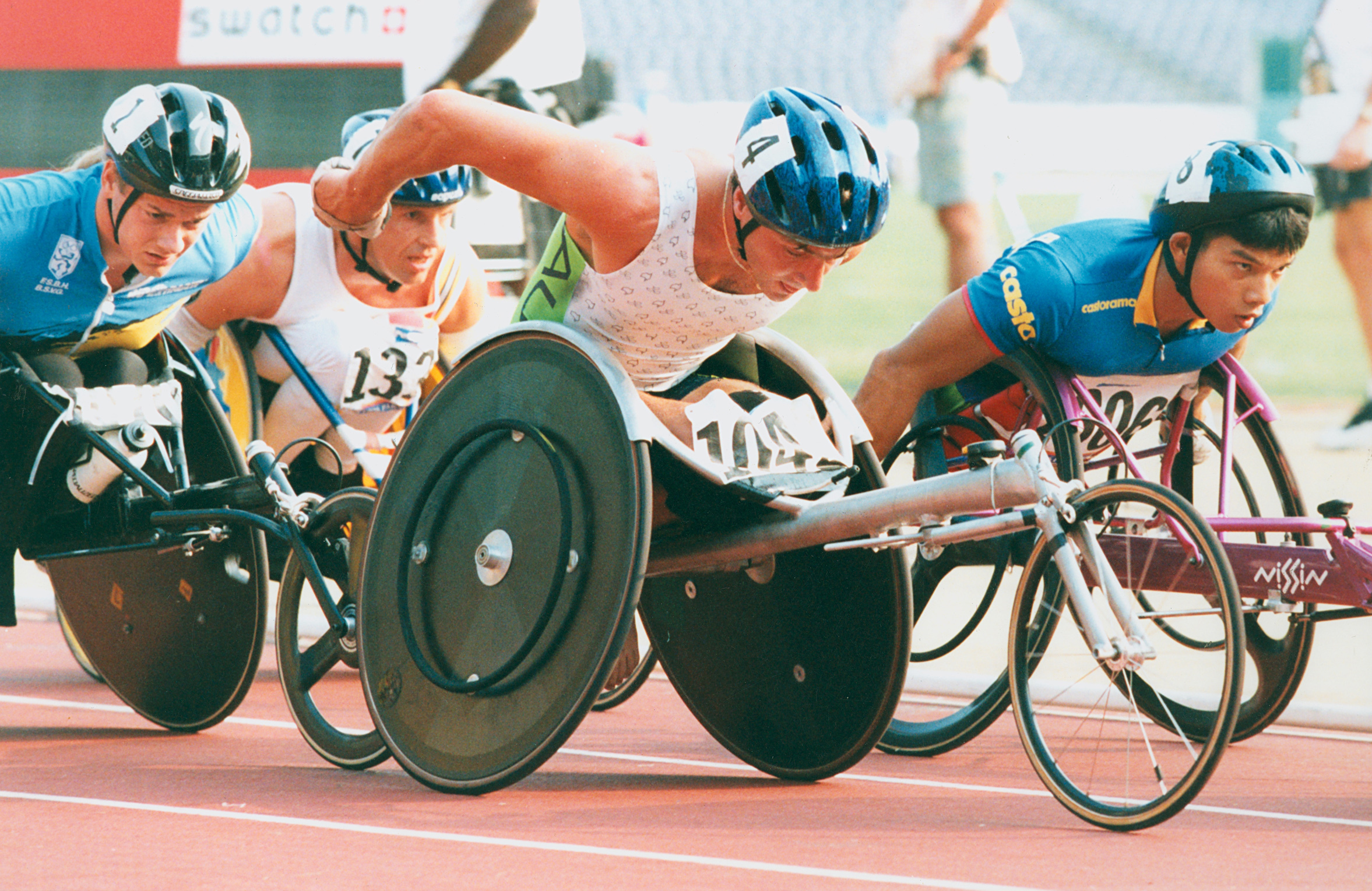

Personal information
- Nationality: Australia
- Born: 7 June 1962 (age 64) Koonya, Tasmania
Medal record
Athletics
Commonwealth Games
Gold medal – first place	1994 Victoria	Men's Wheelchair Marathon
Bronze medal – third place	1994 Victoria	Men's 800 m Wheelchair

Paul Wiggins (born 7 June 1962) is an Australian wheelchair racer.

== Biography ==
Wiggins was born in the Tasmanian town of Koonya, on the Tasman Peninsula. He took up sport during rehabilitation after receiving a broken back due to a collision between his motorcycle and a car in 1985. He began wheelchair racing in 1988.

He competed but did not win any medals at the 1992 Barcelona and 1996 Atlanta Paralympics. At the 1994 Commonwealth Games, he won a gold medal in the Men's Wheelchair Marathon and a bronze medal in the Men's Wheelchair 800 m event;. At the 1994 Los Angeles Marathon, Wiggins and fellow French wheelchair racer Philippe Couprie made a pact that they would finish together, thus causing the first dead heat in the history of the competition. He also won that competition in 1995. He was the first person to break the 20-minute mark in the 10 km wheelchair race.

In 1996 Wiggins was selected to compete in the Wheelchair 1500 m Men's Wheelchair event at the Summer Olympics. He finished 7th overall with a time of 3:16.86.

Wiggins retired from competitive sport in 1998 due to neck problems. Before his retirement, he was an Australian Institute of Sport scholarship holder. A fitter and turner by trade, Wiggins was appointed by the Australian Sports Commission to the role of Wheelchair technician at the 2000 Sydney Paralympics. His expertise in this area also saw him spend 3 months in the US in 1997 helping Cannondale design and build racing wheelchairs.

Wiggins' achievements have been a source of inspiration for many athletes with disabilities including Kurt Fearnley who credits Wiggins as one of the legends of the sport. Wiggins with Jeff Wiseman was responsible for establishing the Oz Day 10K Wheelchair Road Race in 1990.

== Achievements ==
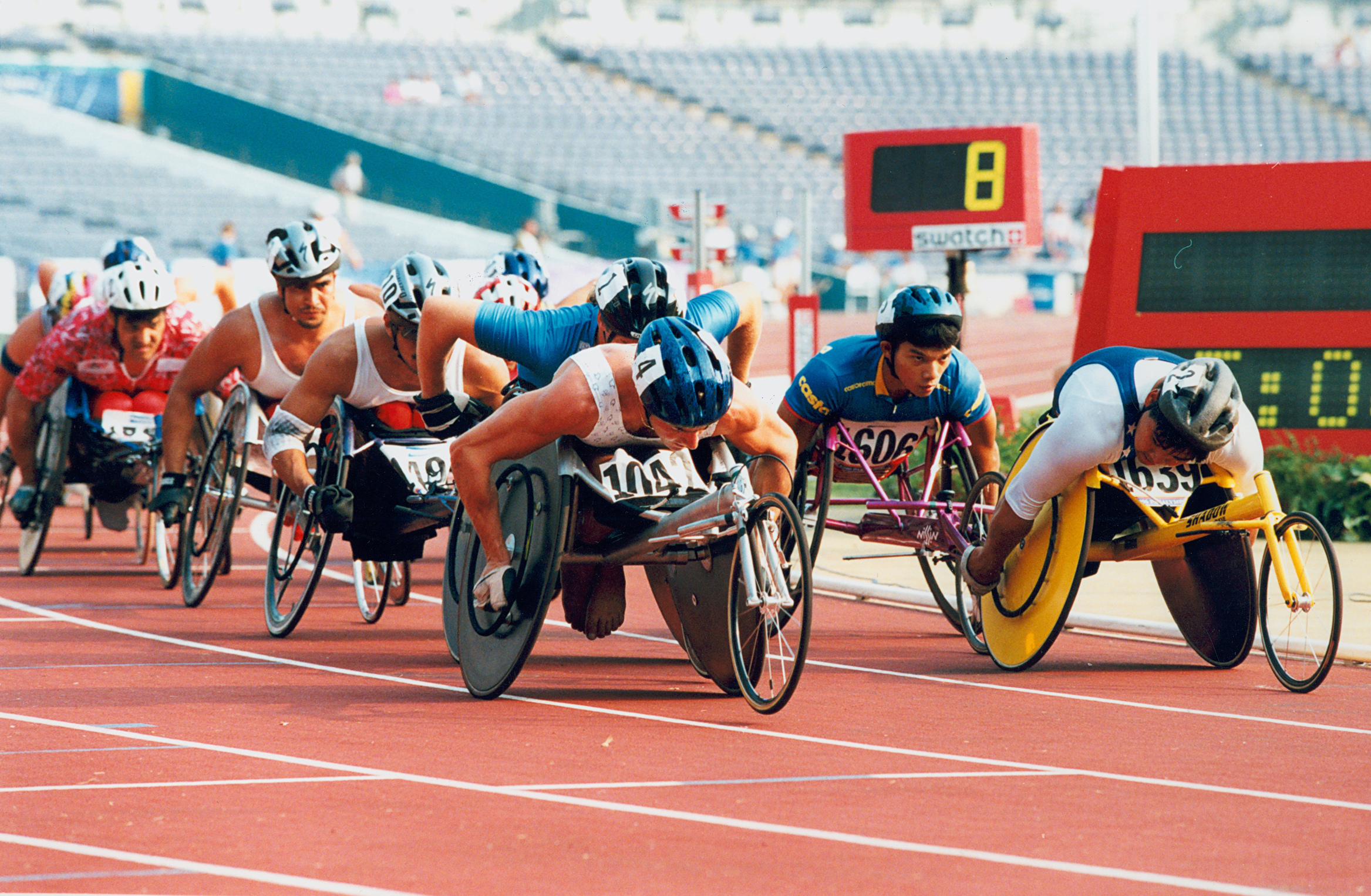
Australian T53 wheelchair athlete Paul Wiggins (centre, number 4 on helmet) competes on the track at the 1996 Atlanta Paralympic Games

- 1990: City to Surf Line Honours (first wheelchair) in a time of 35:38
- 1991: City to Surf Line Honours (first wheelchair) in a time of 30:16
- 1992: Represented Australia at the 1992 Barcelona Summer Paralympics
- 1993: City to Surf Line Honours (first wheelchair) in a time of 29:22.
- 1994:
  - Equal Line Honours Los Angeles Marathon
  - Line Honours Oz Day 10K Wheelchair Road Race
  - Line Honours Gasparilla Distance Classic 15k
  - Gold Medal, Men's Marathon, Commonwealth Games
  - Bronze Medal, Men's 800 m, Commonwealth Games
- 1995:
  - Line Honours Los Angeles Marathon
  - Line Honours Oz Day 10K Wheelchair Road Race
- 1996
  - Represented Australia in the Wheelchair Demonstration Events at the 1996 Olympic Games.
  - Represented Australia in the 1996 Atlanta Paralympics.
  - Line Honours Oz Day 10K Wheelchair Road Race
