= Johnboy Smith =

British wheelchair racer (born 1989)

Personal information
- Nationality: British
- Born: John Charles Smith; 27 November 1989 (age 36) Gravesend, England

Sport
- Country: Great Britain / England
- Sport: Wheelchair Racing
- Disability: Paraplegia
- Disability class: T54
- Events: T54 Marathon, Wheelchair Sprints
Medal record
Commonwealth Games
Gold medal – first place	2022 Birmingham	Men's T54 Marathon
Silver medal – second place	2018 Gold Coast	Men's T54 Marathon

John Charles Smith (born 27 November 1989), known professionally as JohnBoy Smith, is a British parathlete and wheelchair racer of Romany descent who competes in the T54 category sprint events.

== Early life ==
Smith was born in Gravesend, Kent, England. At age 16, he was mistaken for a poacher and shot in the back leading to a spinal cord injury that left him with complete T10/T11 paraplegia. He got motivated to pursue para-athletics and wheelchair racing after watching 2012 London Paralympics.

== Career ==
He won a silver medal in the T54 marathon of 2018 Gold Coast Commonwealth Games held in Australia representing England. He competed in 2020 Summer Paralympics in Tokyo, Japan representing Great Britain in T54 marathon. In 2022 Smith won a gold medal for England at the 2022 Commonwealth Games in the marathon (T54) event.

== See also ==
- Kurt Fearnley
- Toby Gold
