= Sam Rizzo =

Australian Paralympic athlete (born 2000)

Samuel Rizzo
Personal information
- Full name: Samuel Rizzo
- Nationality: Australian
- Born: 3 August 2000 (age 26) Ballarat

Sport
- Country: Australia
- Sport: Athletics

Samuel Rizzo (born 3 August 2000) is an Australian Paralympic athletics competitor. He competed at the 2024 Paris Paralympics.

== Personal ==
Samuel Rizzo was born 3 August 2000 with spina bifda. In 2024, he works as a fabricator and has lives in Buninyong, Victoria.

== Athletics ==
He is classified as a T54 wheelchair racer. After meeting Australian Paralympic gold medallist Richard Colman at the age of eight, and watching him win silver at the 2008 Beijing Paralympics, the idea of competing at the Paralympics became his dream. He started wheelchair at the age of twelve in 2012.

At his first international competition - the 2017 World Para Junior Championships in Switzerland, he won three bronze medals - 100 m, 800 m and 1500 m T54 events. Samuel Rizzo finished sixth in Men's 1500 m T54 at the 2018 Commonwealth Games, Gold Coast. In 2023, Samuel Rizzo won the Men's Open event at the Oz Day 10K Wheelchair Road Race.

Samuel Rizzo competed in three events at the 2023 World Para Athletics Championships, Paris - he made two finals, finishing ninth in the Men's 1500m T54 and tenth in the Men's 5000 m T54. In March 2024, at the Dubai 2024 World Para Athletics Grand Prix, he recorded a Paralympics Games A qualifier. He broke Kurt Fearnley's 1500 m T54 Australian record by four seconds set in 2012, with the time 2:50.84.

After breaking Furnley's record, Samuel Rizzo stated " “I want to help the next group of kids coming through in the same way that Richard Colman and Kurt Fearnley helped me, because if I wasn’t doing this sport, I’m sure my life would look completely different. if I could have half the name of Kurt Fearnley or Richard Colman, and their legacies – I would be a pretty happy, man! One step at a time though.” In the lead up to the 2024 Paris Paralympics, Samuel Rizzo competed in three events - 800m, 1500m and 5000m T54 at the 2024 World Para Athletics Championships, Kobe, Japan.

Samuel Rizzo's selection at the 2024 Paris Paralympics led becoming him Ballarat's first Paralympics wheelchair racer since Greg Smith. At the Games, he competed in three T54 events - 800m, 1500m and 5000n and did not qualify for finals. At the 2025 World Para Athletics Championships in New Delhi, he finished fourth in the Men's 5000m T54 and was ranked seventh in the Men's 800 m and 1500 m T54 heats.

He was coached by Richard Colman and in 2025 by Fred Periac. In 2024, he is a Victorian Institute of Sport scholarship athlete.
