= Paul Nunnari =

Australian track and field athlete

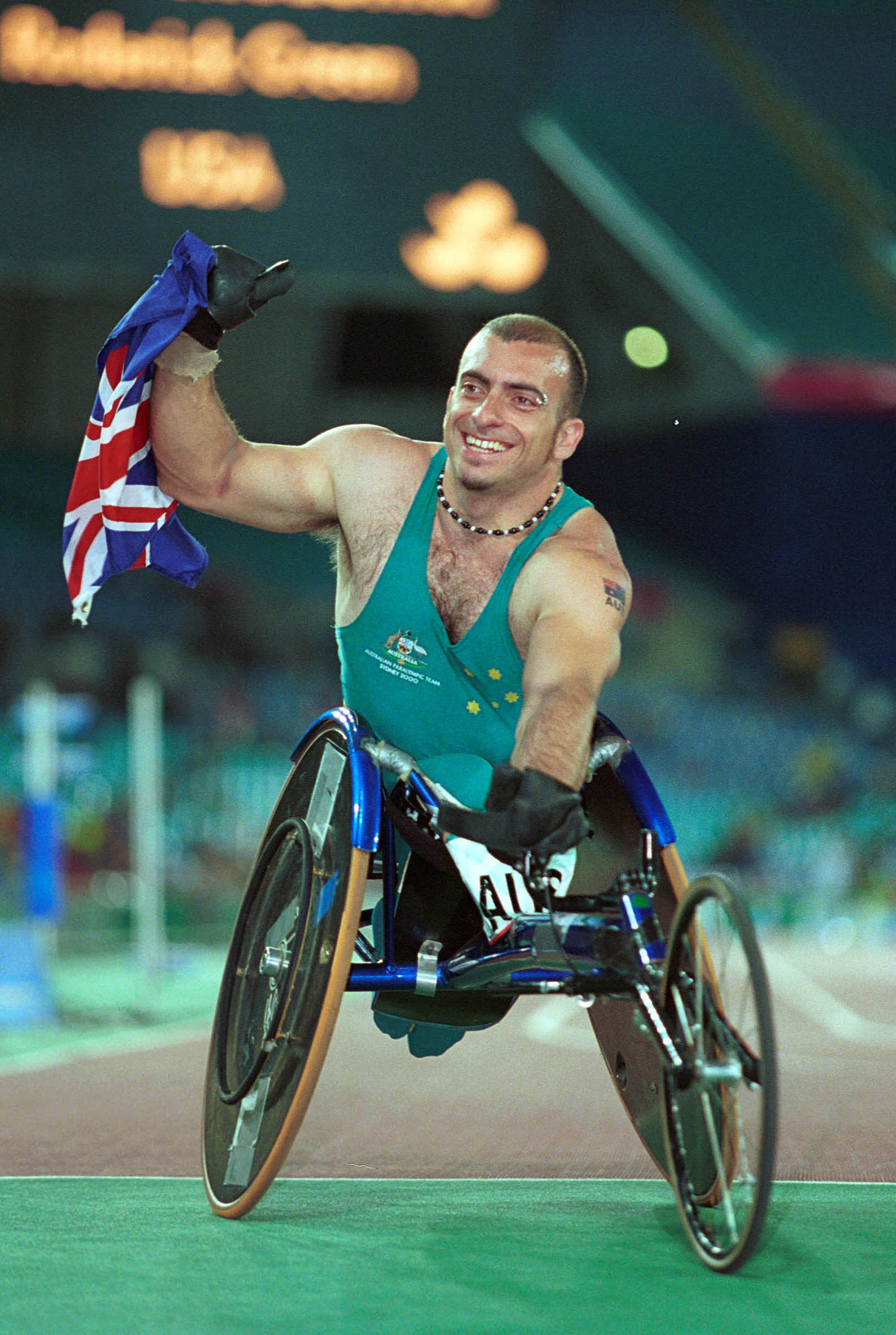
- An elated Nunnari holds up the Australian flag at the 2000 Summer Paralympics

Personal information
- Born: 6 February 1973 (age 53) Auburn, New South Wales, Australia
Medal record
Athletics
Paralympic Games
Silver medal – second place	2000 Sydney	Men's 4x100m Relay T54

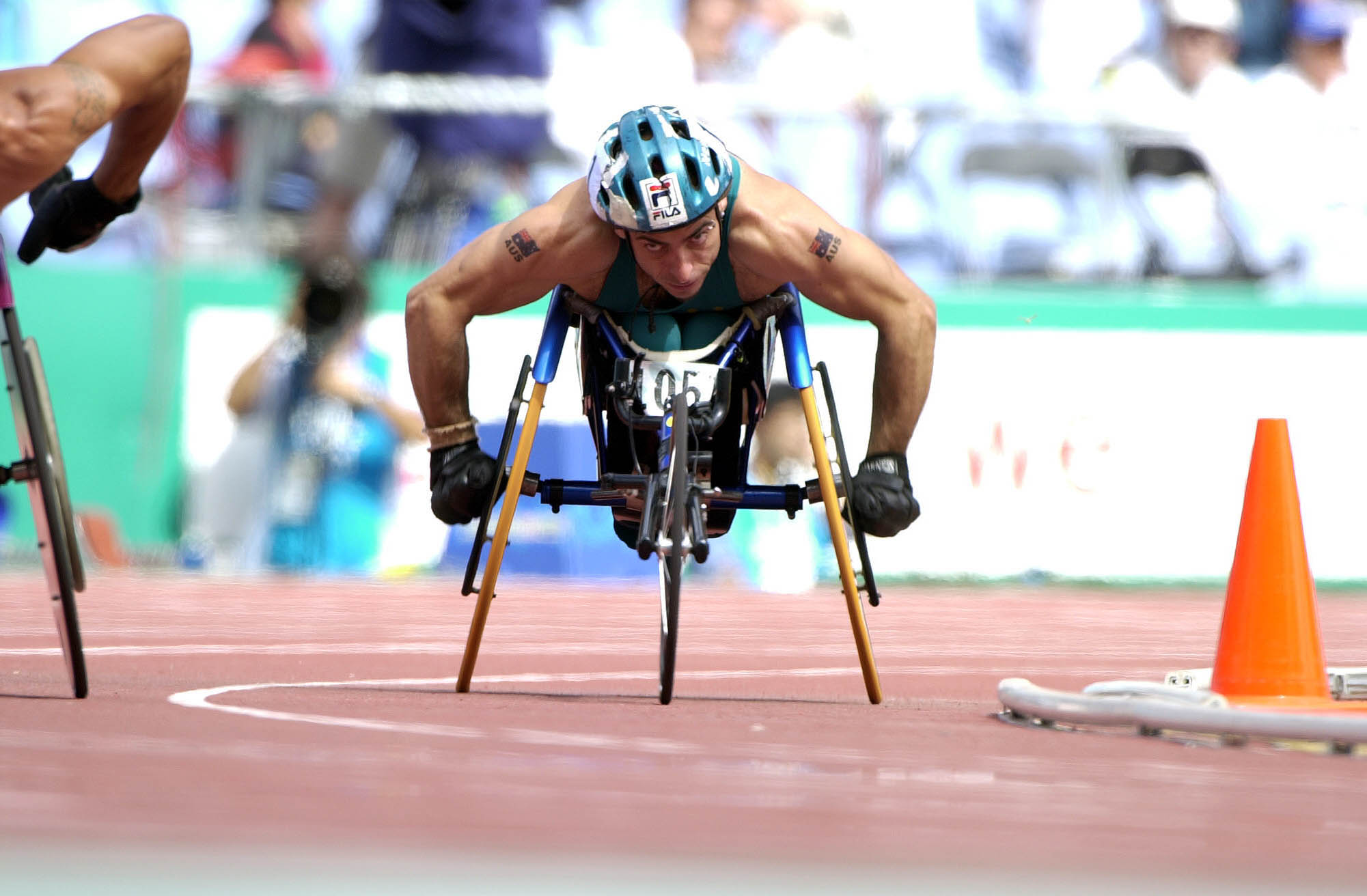
Action shot of Nunnari during the 800 m heat at the 2000 Summer Paralympics

Paul Nunnari (born 6 February 1973 in Auburn, New South Wales) is an Australian disabled track and field athlete, initiator Guinness World Record breaker, and performer.

He represented Australia in three consecutive Paralympic Games (Atlanta 1996, Sydney 2000, and Athens 2004) and three IPC Paralympic World Championships (Birmingham 1998, Villeneuve d'Ascq 2002, and Assen 2006). He won a silver medal in the men's 4 × 100m relay T54 at the 2000 Sydney Olympics.

In 2013, a performance on Australia's Got Talent made him a performer. He is also an advocate for inclusion and accessibility and has worked on many projects.

== Early life and education ==
In 1984, at his age of 11, Paul Nunnari was hit by a car and suffered a spinal cord injury that led him to become a wheelchair user. During his primary school years, he attended St Paul's Primary School in Camden, which installed ramps to accommodate his wheelchair accessibility needs after his accident. He received his secondary education at John Terry Catholic High School in Rosemeadow. At university years, Nunnari studied at the Australian Institute of Sport from 1993 to 1994 and was awarded the Australian Institute of Sport Disability Scholarship with honours.

== Sport career ==
=== Paralympic Games ===
He has competed in three Olympic Games, the 1996 Atlanta Paralympics (organised in Atlanta, United States), the 2000 Sydney Paralympics (organised in Sydney, Australia) and the 2004 Athens Paralympics (organised in Athens, Greece).

Athletics at the 1996 Atlanta Paralympics
Event	Round	Rank
Men's 100 m T53	Heat 2	6
Men's 100 m T53	Heat 4	5
Men's 200 m T53	Heat 4	6
Men's 800 m T53	Heat 4	6
Men's Marathon T52-53	Final Round	48

Athletics at the 2000 Sydney Paralympics
Event	Round	Rank	
Men's Marathon T54	Final Round	19	
Men's 4 × 400 m T54	Heat 2	1	
Men's 4 × 400 m T54	Final Round	2	Silver medal
Men's 4 × 100 m T54	Heat 2	2	
Men's 4 × 100 m T54	Final Round	2	Silver medal
Men's 800 m T54	Heat 2	8	
Men's 1500 m T54	Heat 1	7	
Men's 1500 m T54	Heat 2	9	
Men's 5000 m T54	Heat 1	6	
Men's 5000 m T54	Heat 2	12	

=== IPC Athletics World Championships ===
Paul Nunnari has represented Australia at three of IPC Athletics World Championships. In 1998 he competed at the IPC Athletics World Championships in Birmingham, Great Britain. He later competed at the 2002 IPC Athletics World Championships in Villeneuve d'Ascq, France. Continuing his sporting career, he participated in the 2006 IPC Athletics World Championships in Assen, the Netherlands.

Athletics at the 1998 Men's T55 IPC World Championships – Men's T54 events
Event	Round	Rank
Men's 100 m T55	Heat 3	3
Men's 100 m T55	Final Round	5
Men's 800 m T55	Heat 2	5
Men's 1500 m T55	Heat 2	7
Men's Marathon T55	Final Round	38

Athletics at the 2002 IPC World Championships – Men's T54 events
Event	Round	Rank
Men's 1500 m T54	Heat 3	6
Men's 1500 m T54	Heat 1	10
Men's 5000 m T54	Heat 2	6
Men's 5000 m T54	Final Round	10
Men's 10000 m T54	Heat 1	6
Men's 10000 m T54	Final Round	12
Men's 4 × 100 m T53-54	Heat 1	3
Men's 4 × 400 m T53-54	Heat 2	2
Men's 4 × 400 m T53-54	Final Round	9999
Men's Marathon T54	Final Round	11

Men's Marathon T54 results
Event	Round	Rank
Men's Marathon T54	Final Round	42

=== Wheelchair racing ===
He has also competed in the Sadler's Midnight Sun Race in Alaska five times, three of which he won. In 2024, he competed in GIO Insurance's Oz Day 10k road race, taking first place in the Masters category, placing fifth in the men's category and seventh overall. In 2025, he continued to show competitive performance with a first-place finish in the men's Masters division of GIO Insurance's Oz Day 10k in 2025, he continued to show competitive performances with a first-place finish in the Masters Men's race.

Year	Event	Category	Rank
2024	GIO Insurance's Oz Day 10k	Masters	1st
2024	GIO Insurance's Oz Day 10k	Men's	5th
2024	GIO Insurance's Oz Day 10k	Overall	7th
2025	GIO Insurance's Oz Day 10k	Masters Men's	1st

==== Other competitions ====
Paul Nunnari has a longstanding commitment to athletics and has competed in a wide range of national and international wheelchair and swimming events since his secondary school days.

In December 1988, Paul Nunnari competed in the Boys 17 and over 50m freestyle (wheelchair) at the Times Sport Pacific School Games, finishing second in 47.28 s. In 1993, he further demonstrated his participation in long-distance wheelchair races by competing in the NSW and Sydney Morning Herald Half Marathon. In April 1994, he won the Men's 200 metre wheelchair T3/4 final at the A.C.T. and District National Sports Competitions in track and field in 30.76 seconds. In April 1994, he competed in the A.C.T. and District National Sports Competition in track and field, winning the men's 200 metres wheelchair T3/4 final in 30.76 seconds. In August of the same year, he represented Australia in the 800m wheelchair final at The Glory Games and finished 4th with 1m47.37s. In January 1995, he competed in the Sheraton Wentworth Oz Day 10 kilometre wheelchair race and finished 10th with 24m56.8s.

In 2012, he took part in the 36th Annual Canberra Times Fun Run]. In 2023, he continued to participate in the Sydney Wheelchair Marathon. 2025 saw him swim in the UBC Aquatic Centre as the sole participant on the Afghan Unconquered team at an event held in Whistler and Vancouver. In 2025, his athletic endeavours extended further from track and field to swimming competitions. He swam at the UBC Aquatic Centre as the sole competitor for Team Afghan Unconquered at Vancouver Whistler.

== Performing arts and world records ==
Paul Nunnari is an active promoter of disability inclusion in the arts and media and is committed to changing public stereotypes of disability.

In 2011, while watching his sister perform, he wondered if he could do the same thing in a wheelchair, so he had conversations with his sister's coach, and soon Nunnari began training. In 2013, he performed in a wheelchair, flying around a silk rope high in the air. He reached the finals of Australia's Got Talent as " The Other Superman" and received praise from judges. He stopped at AGT 2013 Semi Finals in the same year.

In 2014, he performed and was interviewed at the Logan City Sports Awards.

On 11 November 2018, he traveled to Rome, Italy, with his coach and partner Melise Avion to participate in the "La Notte dei Record" TV show in collaboration with Guinness World Records. They not only set a show record but also broke a world record: The most 360° rope rotations in a wheelchair in one minute (team of two) is 77.

In 2018, he performed at the Invictus Games Opening Ceremony.

In January 2020, he acted in two roles, Carnivorous Bat/Motorbike Frog, in Justene Williams' "She Conjured The Clouds" at the Sydney Festival within 40 minutes. This show was sold out.

On International Human Rights Day 2020, he performed "The Other Superman" at the Dignified Storytelling Forum at the Dubai World Expo.

In 2023, he performed live as a principal performer at Australia Day at Circular Quay.

Nunnari has also worked on many film and television productions, including the role of a "wheelchair zombie" in the 2019 film Little Monsters, directed by Australian director Abe Forsythe. the 2015 ABC production Fresh Blood Pilot Season, the 2017 Bus Stop Films "Taking Back the Waves", and the 2019 Blackmore's global advertising campaign "Good Health Changes Everything". Bus Stop Films "Taking Back the Waves" in 2017, and Blackmore's global advertising campaign "Good Health Changes Everything" in 2019.

As CEO of the Inclusively Made certification standard, he is committed to adding disability inclusion in film, television, and advertising production.

He has also been involved in some disability-inclusive projects, including work with companies such as Amazon, Disney, Starbucks, Medibank, Westpac, and Woolworths, promoting authentic disability representation in media and advertising.

In 2026, Nunnari competed on the 19th series of Britain’s Got Talent, where he acquired a Golden Buzzer courtesy of Simon Cowell, however, he was eliminated in the Semi-Finals after having placed last in his respective Semi-Final week.

== Advocacy and public service ==
=== Advocacy for disability rights and inclusion ===
Beyond his athletic achievements, Paul Nunnery is actively involved in advocacy work in the area of disability services and sports. In 2006, he raised the issue of Virgin Airlines making carers pay for accompanying wheelchair passengers.

In 2006, he challenged Virgin Airlines' policy that wheelchair users had to pay for carers. The airline's new policy requires certain special passengers to be accompanied by a caregiver and pay their expenses. He said the notion was antiquated and unreasonable, airlines should provide the necessary facilities and services to all passengers, while pointing out that many people with disabilities have limited financial means to afford the additional costs. Airlines responded that the policy was designed to ensure passenger convenience and the well-being of staff, and stated their staff could not provide requests for assistance getting to and from the toilet and with medications.

The move has sparked strong opposition from the disabled community and was also strongly criticized by the federal Human Rights Commissioner, Graeme Innes. The protest was supported by his local federal MP, Liberal marathon runner Pat Farmer, who said legislation could be introduced to change the policy.

Under public pressure, Virgin Airlines eventually changed its policy to require that only passengers weighing more than 130 kilograms be accompanied by a carer.

=== Policy influence and leadership in government ===
In 2016, Paul Nunnari, who holds a leadership role in the NSW Department of Justice, played a key role in the implementation of the Disability Employment Target. The NSW Department of Justice has announced that it will introduce a Disability Employment Target, which is included in the "Disability Inclusion Action Plan 2015–2019", and is designed to promote increased employment opportunities for people with disabilities through the development of internal policies, the provision of flexible working arrangements and support measures that will help to reverse the decline in the number of people with disabilities employed in the public service.

=== Community engagement and cancer awareness ===
Paul Nunnari is the founder of the Bob Jane T-Mart Paul Nunnari Wheelchair Push, which aims to raise public awareness of cancer. He visits local schools, childcare centres, and businesses to raise awareness of disability issues and community fundraising, and encourages schools to get involved in fundraising for local children with cancer through the 24 Hours Against Cancer MacArthur Initiative.

In October 2007, he opened the 3rd Annual 24 Hour Fight Against Cancer Macarthur and shared his experience of his father's death from cancer. To realize her father's wish, Nunnari actively supports local cancer fundraising events.

In 2022, he visited six schools to raise awareness about the 24 Hour Fight Against Cancer, Macarthur, and received a warm welcome from the students.

In 2024, he continued his "Fred Push". Originally started by the late philanthropist Fred Borg OAM, the event was later named "Fred's Push" in honour of Borg's contribution. He visited more than 3000 students at Magdalene Catholic College, Narellan, Minto Public School, Al-Faisal College, Beverly Park Special Needs School and St. Peter's Anglican Grammar, as well as local businesses that support the charity such as Kings Charcoal Chicken Campbelltown, King Kebab House, Aquafit Health Fitness Wellbeing and McDonald's. At the event, he emphasised the importance of community involvement and support for people living with cancer.

"Fred's Push" has become an important annual event in the Macarthur region, aimed at raising public awareness of cancer and raising funds to support local cancer services. Nunnery's continued involvement and efforts have reinvigorated the event and inspired more people to get involved with this charitable cause.

=== Improving accessibility in public events and infrastructure ===
His work is not limited to the policy level; he is also actively involved in the community to promote disability inclusion. He has held leadership positions in several government departments, promoting accessibility infrastructure and inclusive policies, and is committed to creating a more inclusive social environment for persons with disabilities.

As Chair of the City of Sydney Inclusion (Disability) Advisory Group and the Event Access and Inclusion Manager for the NSW Department of Premier and Cabinet, he has been working to increase access to major events and community activities for people with disabilities.

He has worked for many years to increase opportunities for people with disability to participate in major and community events in NSW, and he played a key role in plans to make the Sydney Harbour Bridge wheelchair-accessible (the Sydney Harbour Bridge had access lifts in October 2017).

To coordinate many strategies, he contacts directly with event organizers and planning agencies directly. This includes coordinating with event organisers to optimise transport and communications options, training or providing staff with disability awareness, setting up accessible viewing areas, and providing subtitles and audio descriptions.

He is also involved in ensuring that important events such as Sydney New Year's Eve, Vivid Sydney, Anzac Day, Sydney Gay and Lesbian Mardi Gras, and Surf Sydney are inclusive and accessible to people with disabilities.

== Honors and recognition ==
Paul Nunnari has received many honours and symbolic roles in recognition of his contribution to sport, accessibility, and public service at national and international levels.

=== International representation and ceremonial roles ===
In 1992, he carried the torch on a journey from Greece to Barcelona. From 1993 to 1994, he was awarded an Australian Institute of Sport Disability Scholarship to support his continued development as an elite athlete. In August 1994, he was a member of the Australian delegation to the opening ceremony of the 15th Commonwealth Games in Canada.

In 2025, he was the flag bearer at the Invictus Games Opening Ceremony in Whistler and Vancouver, where he served as the flag bearer for the Afghan Unconquered team, further contributing to the visibility and support of adaptive athletes on the global stage.

=== Innovation and design in inclusive recreation ===
On inclusivity, he was awarded the Public Service Medal in June 2022 in recognition of his outstanding contribution to the promotion of accessibility and inclusivity in public services and community environments. In 2024, he was the initiator of the first wheelchair-accessible skate bowl, which showed the development of an inclusive recreational infrastructure.

== Occupation ==
Paul Nunnari is actively involved in public service and community involvement through a variety of professions and actions.

In 2010, Paul Nunnari stood unsuccessfully for preselection for the federal seat of Macarthur for the Australian Labor Party. In November 2011, he performed on 'The Other Superman', which contributes to public engagement through performance art.

He held multiple positions in the NSW Premier's Department between 2014 and 2019. He was manager of event access and inclusion from January 2014 to May 2017, acting director of events from May 2017 to December 2017, and then from December 2017 to March 2019 as director of ministerial operations. From March 2019 to April 2024, he was director of inclusive infrastructure, placemaking and experiences at the NSW Department of Remote Areas.

Since April 2024, he has been serving as the chief executive officer of Inclusively Made, an organisation focused on promoting inclusive practices and accessible experiences.
