= Fabian Blattman =

Australian Paralympic athlete

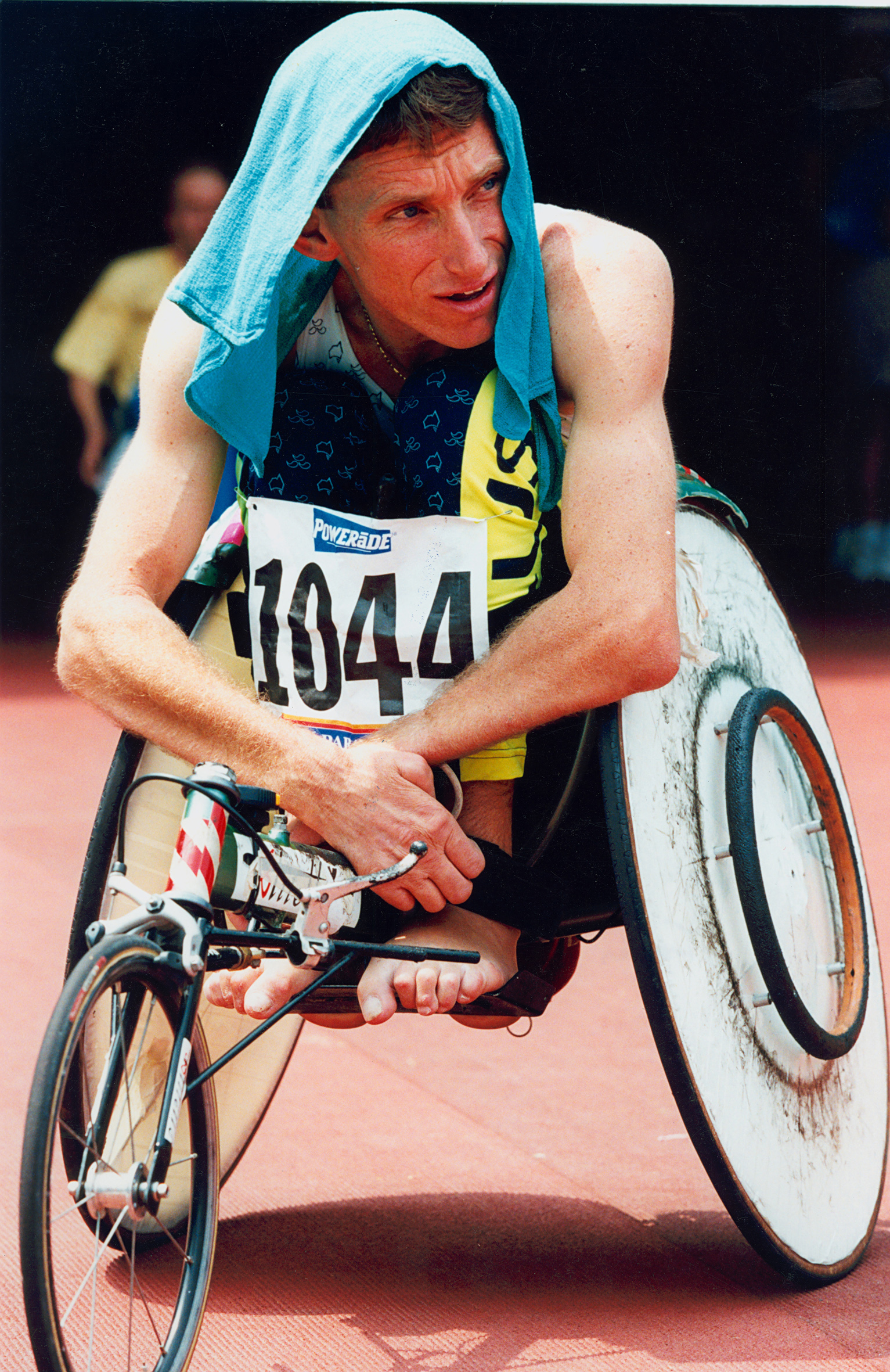
- Australian T50 wheelchair athlete Fabian Blattman shades himself with a towel while he waits for his event at the 1996 Atlanta Paralympics

Personal information
- Full name: Fabian John Blattman
- Nationality: Australia
- Born: 28 December 1958 (age 67) Narrandera, New South Wales, Australia
Medal record
Wheelchair athletics
Paralympic Games
Gold medal – first place	1996 Atlanta	Men's 1500 m T50
Gold medal – first place	2000 Sydney	Men's 400 m T51
Silver medal – second place	1992 Barcelona	Men's 4×100 m TW1–2
Silver medal – second place	1996 Atlanta	Men's 800 m T50
Silver medal – second place	2000 Sydney	Men's 1500 m T51
Bronze medal – third place	1992 Barcelona	Men's 4×400 m TW1–2
Bronze medal – third place	2000 Sydney	Men's 800 m T51
World Championships and Games for the Disabled
Gold medal – first place	1990 Assen	Men's 4x100 m Relay T1
Bronze medal – third place	1990 Assen	Men's 100 m T1
Bronze medal – third place	1990 Assen	Men's 200 m T1
IPC Athletics World Championships
Gold medal – first place	1994 Berlin	Men's 800 m T50
Gold medal – first place	1998 Birmingham	Men's Marathon T51
Silver medal – second place	1994 Berlin	Men's 1500 m T50
Silver medal – second place	1994 Berlin	Men's 5000 m T50
Bronze medal – third place	1994 Berlin	Men's 400 m T50
Bronze medal – third place	1998 Birmingham	Men's 400 m T51

Fabian John Blattman, OAM (born 28 December 1958) is an Australian Paralympic athlete. He became disabled after a motorbike accident. He started playing disabled bowls, before switching to athletics. As a Paralympic athletics competitor, he has set several world records and won two Paralympic gold medals.

== Personal ==
Blattman was born on 28 December 1958 in the New South Wales town of Narrandera. He attended Springwood High School, leaving the school in 1975 to take up an apprenticeship. A 1978 motorcycle accident left him a quadriplegic. Following the accident, he spent eighteen months in rehabilitation at the Mt Wilga Rehabilitation Centre in Hornsby, New South Wales. After rehabilitation, Blattman moved into his parents' home in Springwood, New South Wales. The house was retrofitted with a lift to enable him to reach his third floor bedroom. Blattman moved out of his parents' home, and independently travels around the world. He played table tennis socially.

== Sporting career ==
=== Bowls ===
In 1985, Blattman competed at the Royal North Shore Paraplegic Games in the bowls event.

=== Athletics ===
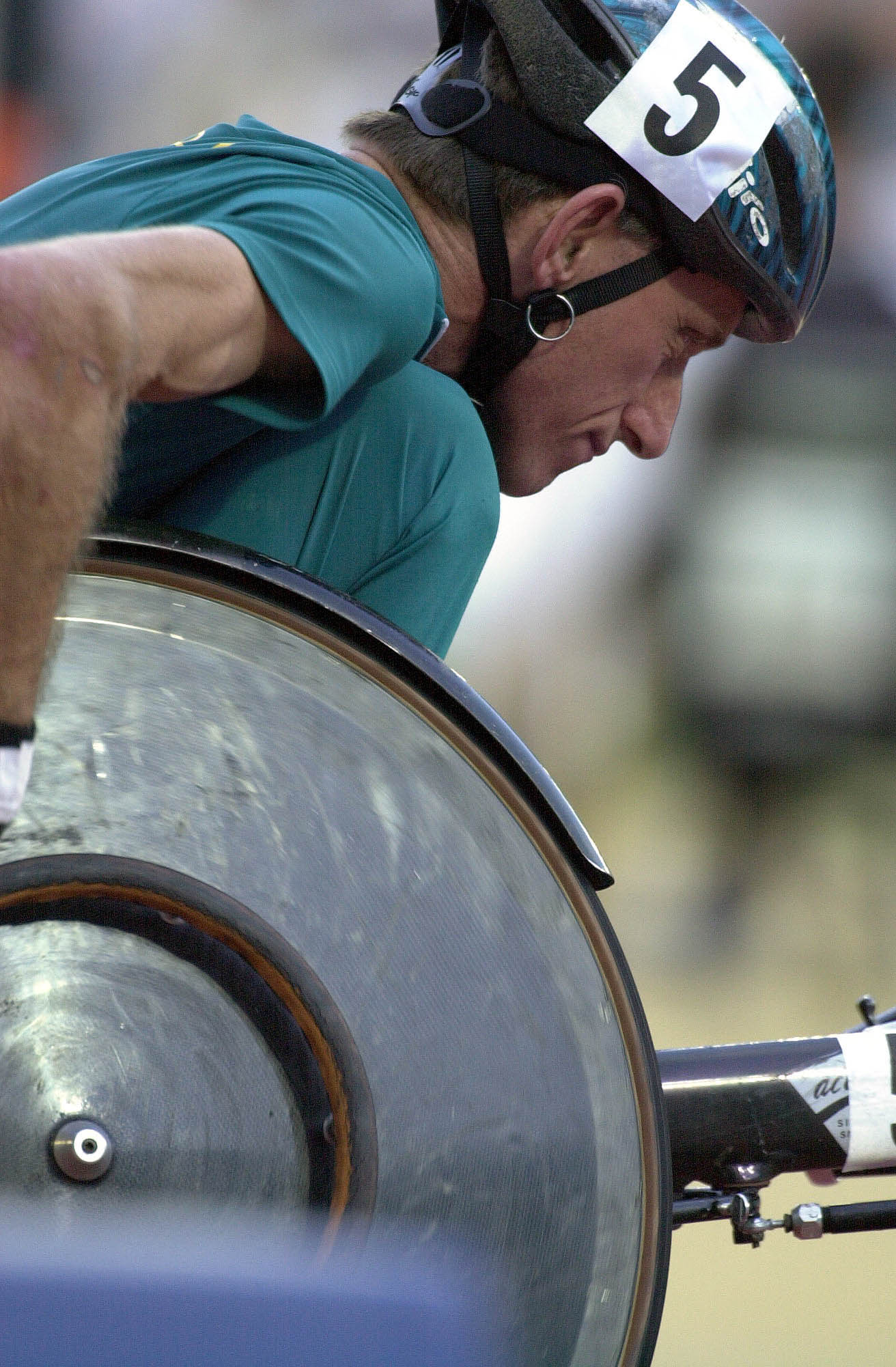
Close up of Blattman during the 800 m T51 final event at the 2000 Sydney Paralympics

Blattman started participating in wheelchair athletics to improve his general fitness level. At the 1988 Seoul Games, he came fifth in the first heat of the Men's 200 m 1A – event. He competed in the Stoke Mandeville Games in 1989 and 1990. In 1990, at the World Championships and Games for the Disabled in Assen, Netherlands he won a gold medal in the men's 4x100 m relay T1 event and two bronze medals in the 100 m and 200 m T1 events. He won a silver medal in the 4×100 m event and a bronze medal in the 4×400 m event at the 1992 Summer Paralympics. At the 1996 Atlanta Games, he won a gold medal in the 1500 m event, for which he received a Medal of the Order of Australia, and a silver medal in the 800 m event. In 1998, Blattman won the Men's Marathon (T51) event at the World Championships. At the 2000 Sydney Games, he won a gold medal in the men's 400 m T51 event, a silver medal in the men's 1500 m T51 event, and a bronze medal in the men's 800 m T51 event. That year, he received an Australian Sports Medal. In 2002, Blattman came in first in the T51 Quads event at the Arrive Alive Summer Down Under Wheelchair Track and Road Racing Series 10k event, with a time of 37.52. He competed at the 2010 Optus Grand Prix in Canberra in the Men & Women 5,000 metres wheelchair event, but he did not finish.

He won the Oz Day 10K Wheelchair Road Race T51 event nine times, firstly in 1992 and then in each year from 1995 to 2002.

Blattman has held several world records in athletics. These include:

- 1990: 4x100 and 4x400 m events at the 1990 Stoke Mandeville Games
- 1991: 1500 m
- 1995: 2:40.15 in the men's T51 800 m event in Etobicoke, Canada on 25 June
- 1998: 05:01.49 in the 1500 m and 16:51.81 in the 5000 m at the Summer Down Under international wheelchair track meeting at Sydney International Athletic Centre on 28 January
- 1999: 16:46.95 in the 5000 m at the Summer Down Under international wheelchair track meeting at Sydney International Athletic Centre on 29 January

He had an Australian Institute of Sport scholarship from 1994 to 2000 in Athletics. His coach was Andrew Dawes, who has worked with Paralympic gold medalists Louise Sauvage and Greg Smith.
