= Nathan Arkley =

Australian Paralympic athlete

Nathenial "Nath" Arkley
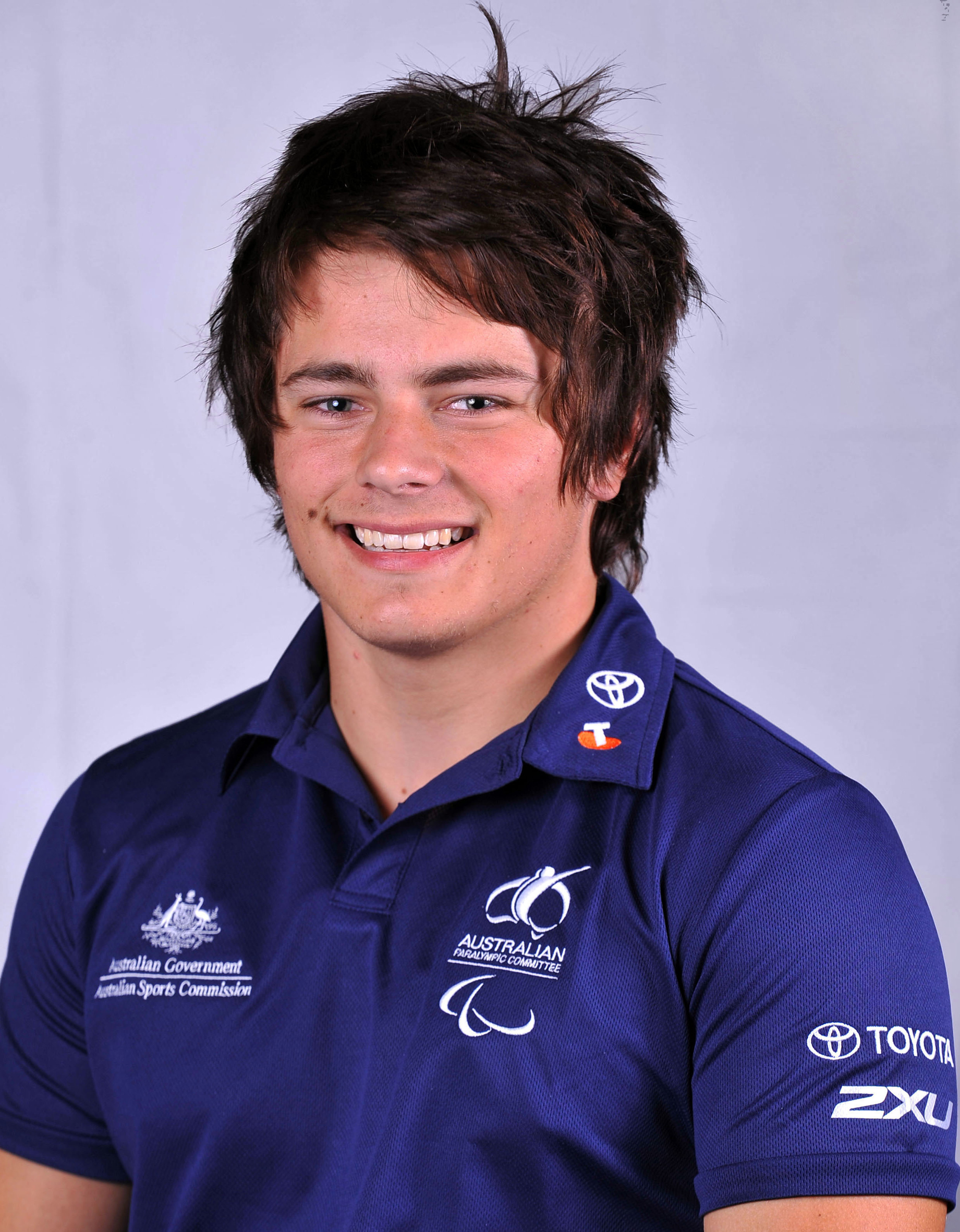
- 2012 Australian Paralympic team portrait of Arkley

Personal information
- Full name: Nathenial Arkley
- Nickname: Nath
- Nationality: Australian
- Born: 27 October 1994 (age 32)

Sport
- Country: Australia
- Sport: Paralympic athletics

Achievements and titles
- Paralympic finals: 2012
Medal record
Men's athletics
Representing Australia
Paralympic Games
Bronze medal – third place	2012 London	4 × 400 m T53/54

Nathenial "Nath" Arkley (born 27 October 1994) is an Australian Paralympic track and field athlete. At the 2012 Summer Paralympics, he won a bronze medal.

== Personal ==
Arkley was born on 27 October 1994. He is a paraplegic as a result of the viral infection, transverse myelitis, he caught when he was eight years old. As of 2012, he lives in St Agnes, South Australia. He attended St Pauls College in Gilles Plains.

== Athletics ==
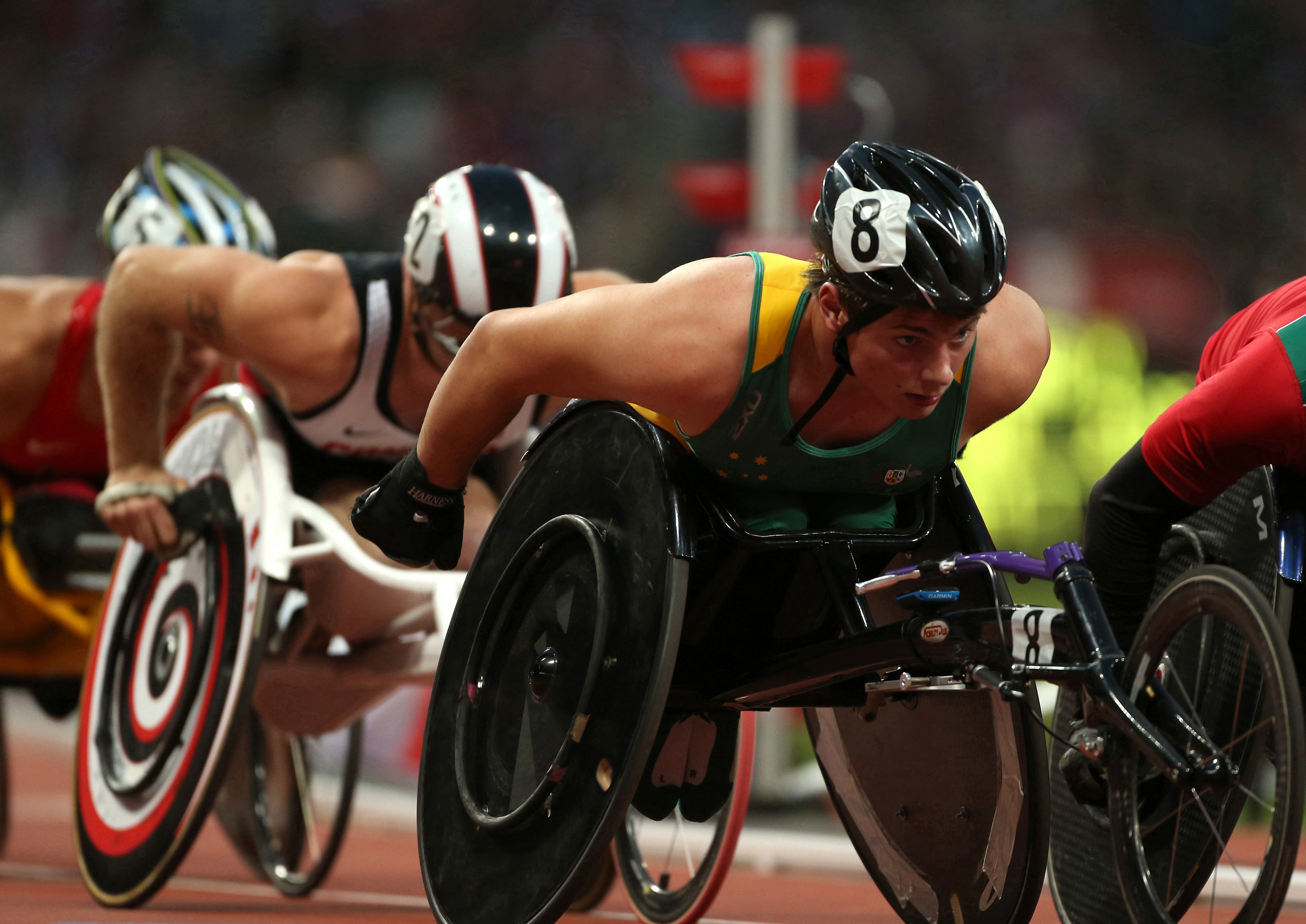
Arkley at the 2012 London Paralympics

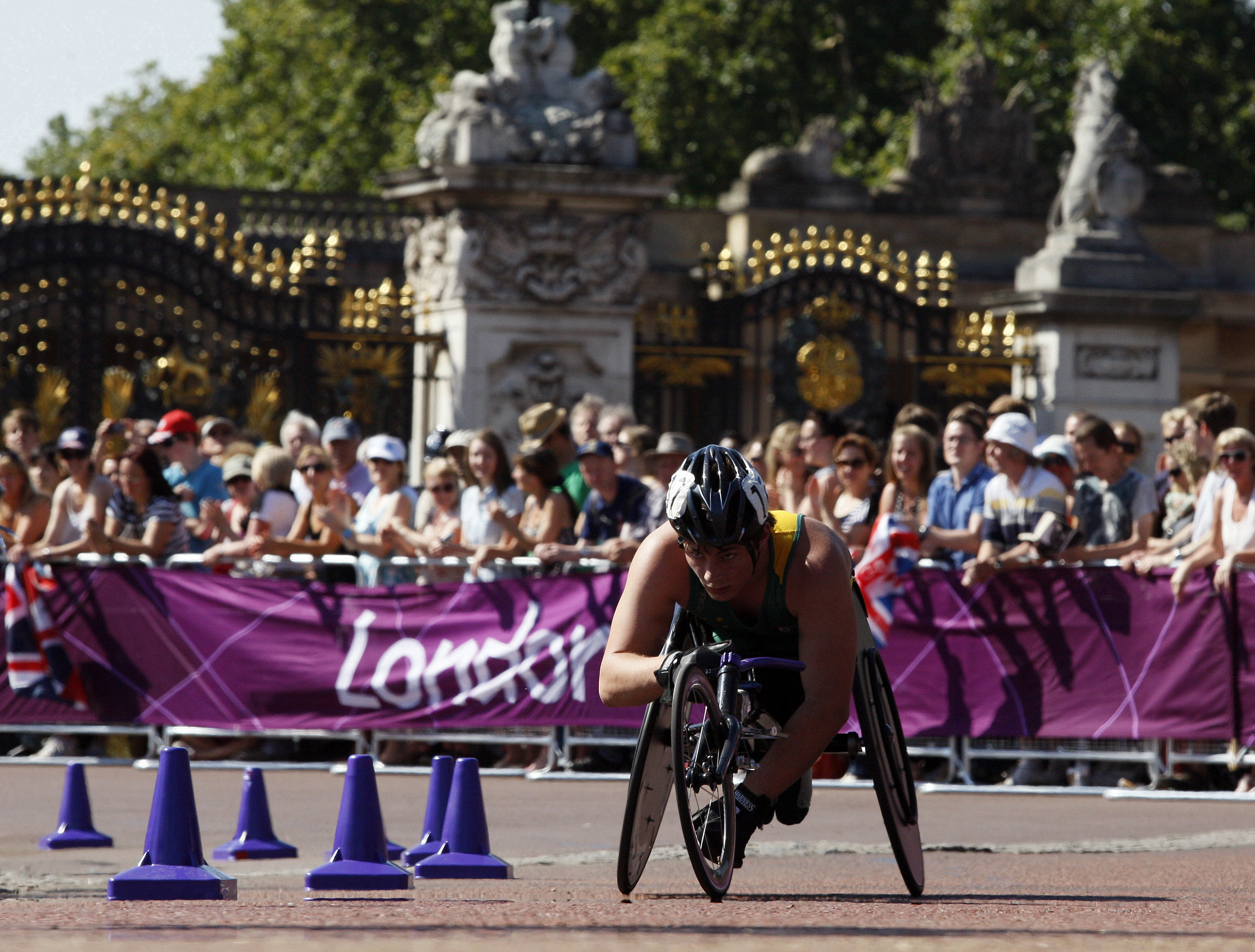
Arkley during the marathon at the 2012 London Paralympics

Arkley is a T54 classified athlete. He has a special three carbon wheeled racing wheelchair. He has been coached by John Hammon since 2009.

Arkley started competing in wheelchair athletics in 2005. Prior to his paraplegia, he participated in track at school. He first represented Australian in 2009. At the Swiss hosted 2009 IWAS Junior World Championships, he won five silver medals and two gold medals. In 2012, he won the Oz Day 10K men's junior division. He sometimes trains with Jake Lappin. In 2012, he would train by wheeling up to 200 kilometres (120 mi) a week. He was selected to represent Australia at the 2012 Summer Paralympics in athletics. Arkley participated in the Men's 5000 m T54, Men's Marathon T54, and the Men's 4 × 400 m T53/54 – winning a bronze in the 4 × 400 m.
