= Jeff Wiseman =

Australian Paralympic athlete (born 1950)

Personal information
- Nationality: Australian
- Born: 26 January 1950 (age 76)

Jeff Wiseman (born 26 January 1950) is an Australian Paralympic athlete who has competed at two Paralympics and is a wheelchair mechanic. He has played a significant role in the development of wheelchair sport in New South Wales.

Wiseman was born on Australia Day 26 January 1950. Wiseman competed at the 1984 Summer Paralympics in Stoke Mandeville in five events with fourth place in the athletics slalom his best result. At the 1988 Seoul Games, he competed in four events with seventh in the marathon his best place. He was captain of the Australian team that competed at the 1982 FESPIC Games in Hong Kong.

Wiseman, with Peter Trotter, was responsible for establishing the Oz Day 10K Wheelchair Road Race in Sydney. Wiseman has competed in the City2Surf and City-Bay community road races. Wiseman's contribution has been recognised through being a Life Member of Wheelchair Sports NSW and Manly Pathway of Olympians. Wiseman lives in Sydney's Northern Beaches where he operates a wheelchair maintenance business.
