= Sarah Clifton-Bligh =

Australian Paralympic athlete (born 2004)

Personal information
- Nationality: Australian
- Born: 19 January 2004 (age 22) Sydney, Australia

Sport
- Country: Australia
- Sport: Athletics
- Club: Sydney University Athletics Club

Sarah Clifton-Bligh (born 19 January 2004) is an Australian Paralympic athletics competitor. She competed at the 2024 Paris Paralympics.

== Personal ==
Clifton-Bligh was born on 19 January 2004. She was born with cerebral palsy, which causes her to suffer from severe coordination impairment in all four of her limbs and trunk. She attended Presbyterian Ladies'College, Sydney. She has a TAFE Diploma in Library and Information Services.

== Athletics ==
She is classified as a T33 athlete. She started competing in athletics at the age of eight. She competes in track and throws events. At the 2022 Commonwealth Games, Birmingham, England, she finished fifth in the Women's 100 m T34. She competed in three events at the 2023 World Para Athletics Championships, Paris – seventh in 100 m and 800 m T34 and shot put F32.

At the 2024 World Para Athletics Championships in Kobe, Japan, she finished fifth in 100 m and 800 m T34 and seventh in the Women's Shot Put F32. At the 2024 Paris Paralympics, she finished tenth in the Women's Shotput F32 and 16th in the Women's Club throw.

She is coached by Louise Sauvage.

In 2021, she was awarded the Kurt Fearnley Scholarship for 2021/22.
