= Simon Lawson =

British wheelchair racer (born 1982)

Personal information
- Nationality: United Kingdom

Sport
- Sport: Wheelchair racing
- Disability class: T54
Medal record
Commonwealth Games
Representing England
Bronze medal – third place	2018 Gold Coast	Men's T54 Marathon

Simon Lawson (born June 7 1982) is a British Paralympic athlete competing in category T54 wheelchair racing events. He competed in the marathon at the 2016 Paralympics placing 14th out of 18 finishers. He is married to 11 time Paralympic gold medalist Tanni Grey-Thompson. He won bronze in the T54 marathon at the 2018 Commonwealth Games.
