= Jake Lappin =

Australian Paralympic athlete (born 1992)

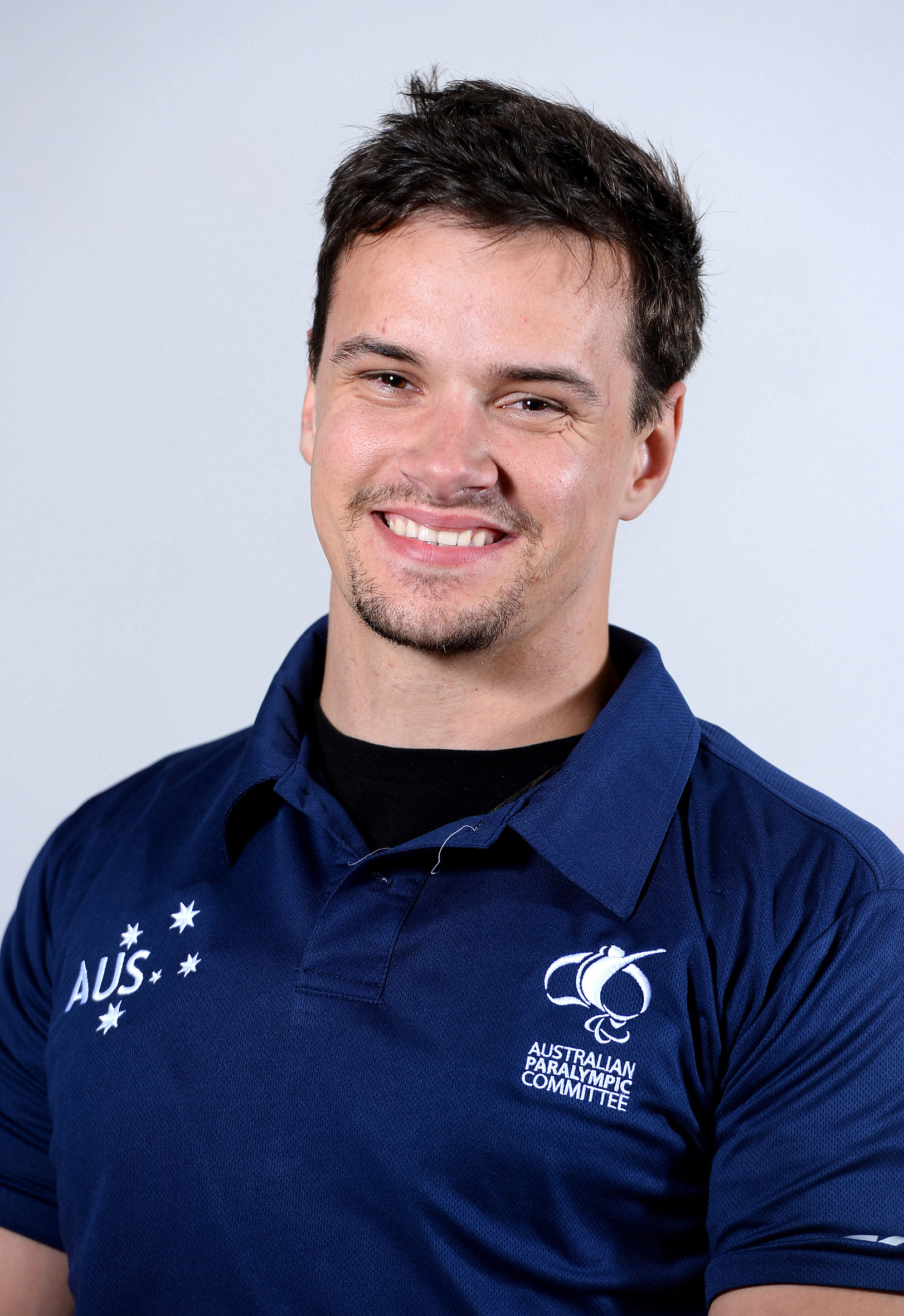
- 2016 Australian Paralympic team portrait of Lappin

Personal information
- Nationality: Australian
- Born: 11 September 1992 (age 34)

Sport
- Country: Australia
- Sport: Athletics

Jake Lappin (born 11 September 1992) is an Australian para-athlete competing as a wheelchair racer. He represented Australia at the London 2012 Summer Paralympics and at the 2016 Rio Paralympics.

== Personal ==
Lappin was born on 11 September 1992 in Kilmore, Victoria. He races in the T54 category as a middle distance and long distance wheelchair racer.

== Athletics ==
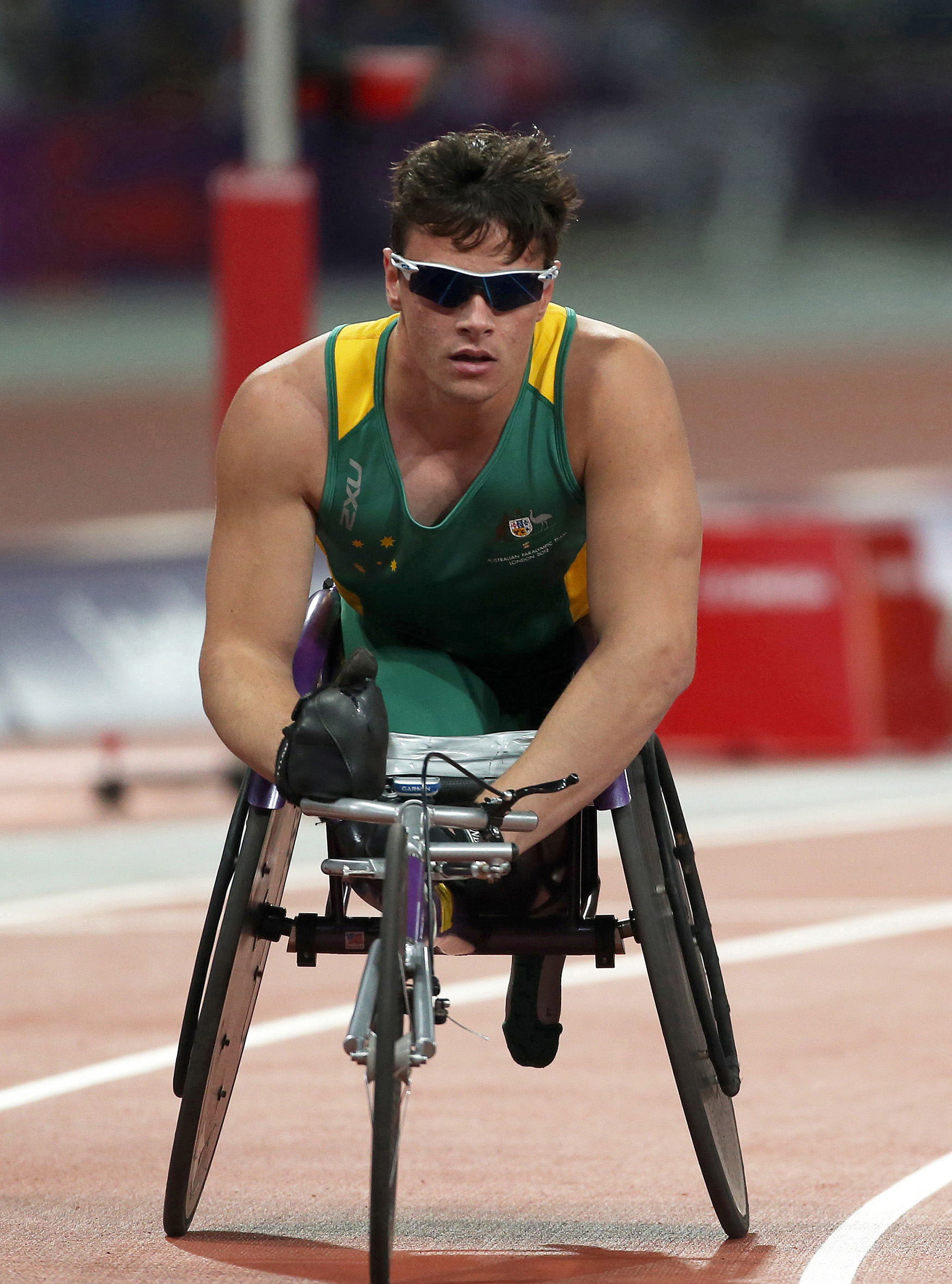
Lappin at the 2012 London Paralympics

Lappin competes in the T54 classification, and specialises in the 400 metre and 800 metre wheelchair events. He is a member of the Glenhuntly Athletic Club.

Lappin started racing in 2005. At the 2008 Adelaide's City-Bay fun run, he finished first in the wheelchair category with a time of 29:42 minutes. In 2010, he was ranked 17th in the world in the 800 metre race. He competed in the 2010 Perth City to Surf, where he won the 11 km wheelchair event. In 2010, he won the Cedartown 5K Wheelchair Race in the Junior Boys category with a time of 11:27.85 minutes. At the 2010 Australian Athletes with a Disability Championships, he came in second in the 1500m wheelchair event with a time of 3:23.79. He came in third in the T54 men's 100m wheelchair with a time of 16.62 seconds and third in the 200m wheelchair with a time of 29.31 seconds.

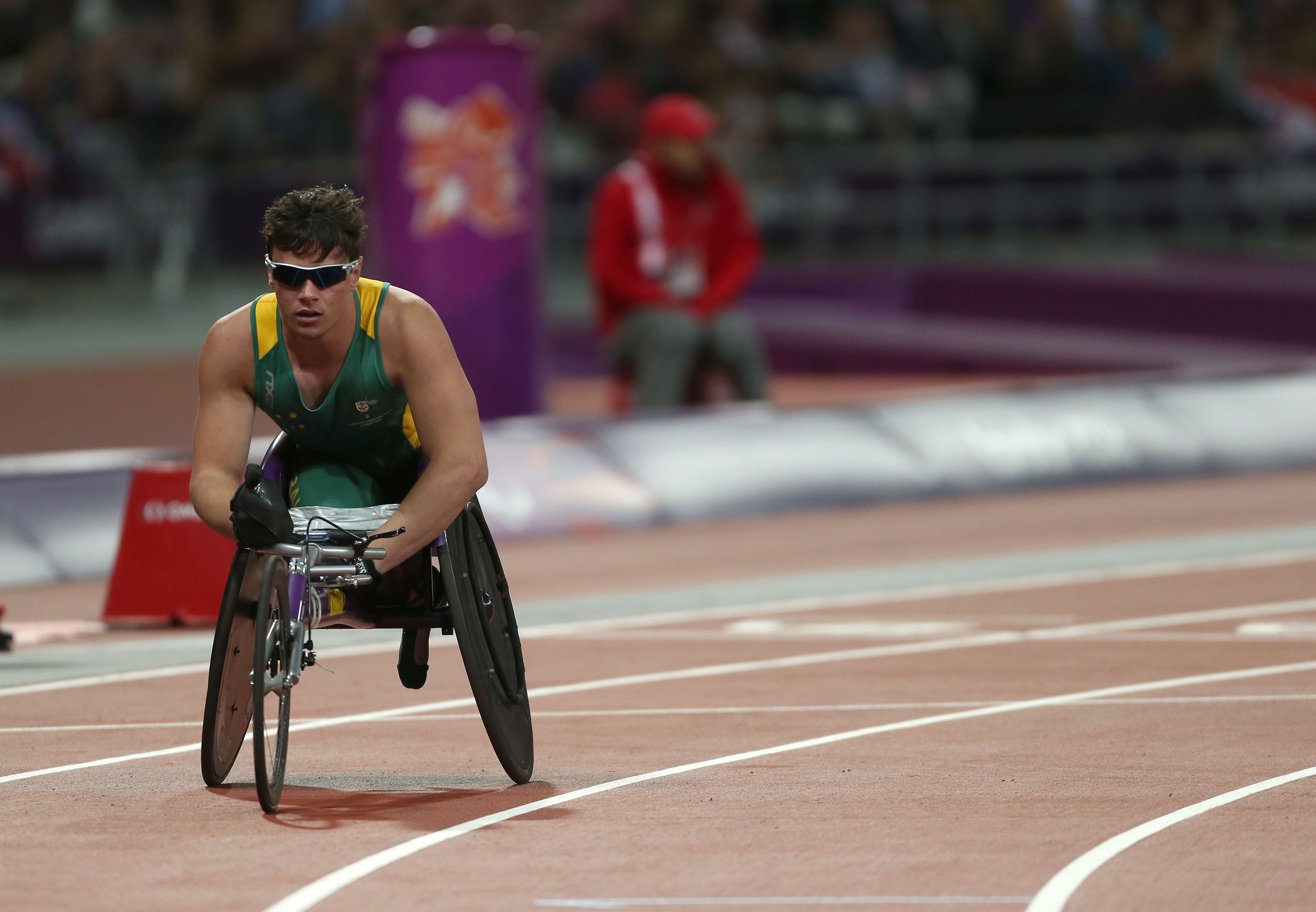
Lappin at the 2012 London Paralympics

He competed in the 2010 Commonwealth Games in the men's wheelchair T54 1500m. He was one three Australians to qualify for the finals, with the other two being Kurt Fearnley and Richard Colman. He finished third in the 1,500 metre heats with a time of .22.05.

In 2011, he competed in Sydney's City2Surf event in the first year the event had an elite wheelchair category. His and other wheelchair competitors participation was funded by sponsors.

At the 2012 Summer Paralympics he competed in the Men's 400m T54 and 800m T54 but did not medal.

At the 2016 Rio Paralympics, Lappin competed in two events. He finished 11th ranked in the Mem's 100 m T54 heats and 14th in the Men's 1500 m T54 heats and did not progress to the finals. He withdrew from the Men's 800 m T54 .

Jake bounced back to top form in June 2017 as he prepared for the London world championships during a series of races in Switzerland. He broke Kurt Fearnley's national 800m record which had stood for 13 years.

In June 2017, he broke Kurt Fearnley's 800m T54 Australian record which had stood for 13 years. At the 2017 World Para Athletics Championships in London, England, he was ranked 10th in the Men's 1500m T54 and 20th in the Men's 800m T54.

In 2017, he is coached by Fred Periac.

He competed at the 2022 Commonwealth Games where he came 4th in the Men's 1500 m T54 and 5th in the Men's T54 marathon.
