= Wheelchair Sports NSW =

Sports organisation in New South Wales, Australia

Wheelchair Sports NSW is the peak New South Wales sports organisation that assists people with disabilities ranging from spinal cord injury, spina bifida, amputation, paraplegia, quadriplegia to other similar disabling conditions. The organisation was established as the Paraplegic Sports Club, a section of the Paraplegic Association of NSW (also known as ParaQuad) in October 1961. It offers a range of sports programs, facilities and financial support from beginners to Paralympians.

== History ==
In April 1961, the Paraplegic and Quadriplegic Association of NSW (later known as ParaQuad NSW) as established to create opportunities for people with a spinal disability. In October 1961, the Paraplegic Sports Club of NSW, a section of the Association was formed with the foundation members being Kevin Betts, Ashley Coops, Trevor French, Daphne Hilton and Bruce Thwaite. They were later joined by Eric Magennis and Harold Squires. The Association viewed sport as rehabilitation in its formative years. In the late 1970s and early 1980s, the Club made a transition from a sports club to a structured statewide organization and in January 1987 it became the NSW Wheelchair Sports Association. In 2006, it changed its name from NSW Wheelchair Sports Association Inc. to Wheelchair Sports NSW (WS NSW). To celebrate 50 years of operation in 2011, the book Pushing Strong was published.

== Services ==
=== Sports ===
It supports the following sports: archery, wheelchair basketball, cue sports, fencing, hand cycling lawn bowls, powerlifting, wheelchair rugby, shooting, swimming, wheelchair tennis and track and field.

=== Facilities ===
The Kevin Betts Stadium (known as the Coca-Cola Stadium until 1992) was opened on 13 May 1986. The Association received support from Coca-Cola, Blacktown City Council, Rotary Club of Holroyd and Rotaract in its construction.

=== Events ===
Wheelchair Sports NSW has managed several major events including:

- 7th National Paraplegic and Quadriplegic Games in 1972
- FESPIC Games in 1977
- NSW Wheelchair Tennis Championships commenced in 1983 and is now held annually
- Oz Day 10K race first held on 26 January 1990 and is now a major Australia Day event held in The Rocks, Sydney
- 1998 Gold Cup – Wheelchair Basketball World Championship

== Notable NSW Wheelchair Paralympians ==
Selected NSW high achieving wheelchair athletes:

- Athletics – Louise Sauvage, Kurt Fearnley, Terry Giddy, Gary Hooper, Daphne Hilton (also swimming and table tennis)
- Powerlifting – Vic Renalson (also athletics)
- Rowing – John Maclean
- Shooting – Alan Chadwick
- Swimming – Matthew Levy
- Wheelchair basketball – Liesl Tesch (also sailing), Lisa Edmonds Troy Sachs, Michael Callahan, Gerry Hewson
- Wheelchair rugby – Ryley Batt
- Wheelchair tennis – David Hall
