= Kurt Fearnley =

Australian wheelchair racer (born 1981)

Kurt Fearnley AO PLY
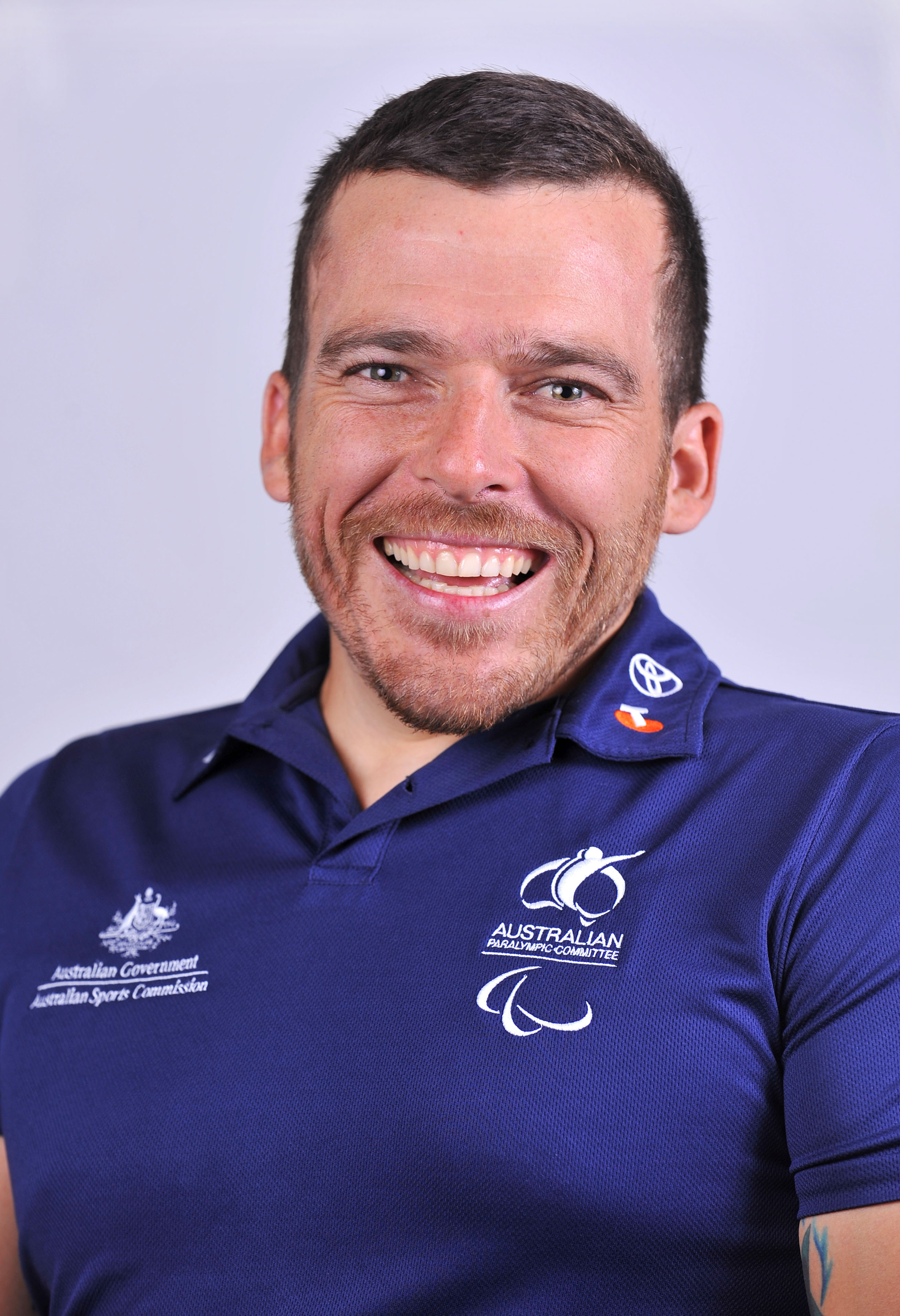
- 2012 Australian Paralympic team portrait of Fearnley

Personal information
- Full name: Kurt Harry Fearnley
- Born: 23 March 1981 (age 45) Cowra, New South Wales, Australia
- Height: 140 cm (4 ft 7 in)
- Weight: 50 kg (110 lb)
- Website: www.kurtfearnley.com

Sport
- Country: Australia
Medal record
Event	1st	2nd	3rd
Paralympic Games	3	7	3
World Championships	4	0	1
Commonwealth Games	2	2	0
Total	9	9	4
Men's athletics
Paralympic Games
Gold medal – first place	2004 Athens	5000 m T54
Gold medal – first place	2004 Athens	Marathon T54
Gold medal – first place	2008 Beijing	Marathon T54
Silver medal – second place	2000 Sydney	800 m T54
Silver medal – second place	2000 Sydney	4×100 m relay T53/T54
Silver medal – second place	2004 Athens	4×100 m relay T53/T54
Silver medal – second place	2008 Beijing	800 m T54
Silver medal – second place	2008 Beijing	5000 m T54
Silver medal – second place	2012 London	5000 m T54
Silver medal – second place	2016 Rio de Janeiro	Marathon T54
Bronze medal – third place	2008 Beijing	1500 m T54
Bronze medal – third place	2012 London	Marathon T54
Bronze medal – third place	2016 Rio de Janeiro	5000 m T53/54
IPC Athletics World Championships
Gold medal – first place	2006 Assen	800 m T54
Gold medal – first place	2006 Assen	5000 m T54
Gold medal – first place	2006 Assen	Marathon T54
Gold medal – first place	2011 Christchurch	Marathon T54
Bronze medal – third place	2006 Assen	1500 m T54
Commonwealth Games
Gold medal – first place	2010 Delhi	1500 m T54
Gold medal – first place	2018 Gold Coast	Marathon T54
Silver medal – second place	2014 Glasgow	1500 m T54
Silver medal – second place	2018 Gold Coast	1500 m T54

Kurt Harry Fearnley, AO PLY (born 23 March 1981) is an Australian wheelchair racer, who has won gold medals at the Paralympic Games and crawled the Kokoda Track without a wheelchair. He has a congenital disorder called sacral agenesis which prevented fetal development of certain parts of his lower spine and all of his sacrum. In Paralympic events he is classified in the T54 classification. He focuses on long and middle-distance wheelchair races, and has also won medals in sprint relays. He participated in the 2000, 2004, 2008, 2012 and 2016 Summer Paralympic Games, finishing his Paralympic Games career with thirteen medals (three gold, seven silver and three bronze). He won a gold and silver medal at the 2018 Commonwealth Games and was the Australian flag bearer at the closing ceremony.

== Personal life ==
Fearnley was born on 23 March 1981 in Cowra, New South Wales as the youngest of five children. He was born with sacral agenesis; he is missing certain parts of his lower spine and all of his sacrum. At the time of his birth, doctors did not believe he would live longer than a week. He grew up in Carcoar. At school, he took part in all sports, including athletics and rugby league. He took up wheelchair racing at the age of 14, and took it to an elite level at the age of 17.

The town had got together and raised $10,000 and they bought the chair and they ... paid for the trip and they said if he needs anything else you know we're going to make sure that he... gets that opportunity. So it's a town of 200 people within a week had had 10 grand sitting there, so... it's nice now that I know that Carcoar have this bond I guess, or they know that they're the reason that I'm here.

— Kurt Fearnley

After leaving Blayney High School, he moved to Sydney to train and start a Bachelor of Human Movement degree. He lives in Newcastle and is a teacher. He is 1.4 metres (4 ft 7 in) tall and weighs 50 kilograms (110 lb).

In 2010, Fearnley married Sheridan Rosconi at Glenrock Lagoon. Fearnley and Rosconi met while studying at Charles Sturt University in Bathurst, New South Wales. Their first son, Harry, was born in 2013 with a second child, a daughter Emilia born in 2017.

In 2014, his autobiography, Pushing the Limits: Life, Marathons & Kokoda, was published.

== Athletic career ==
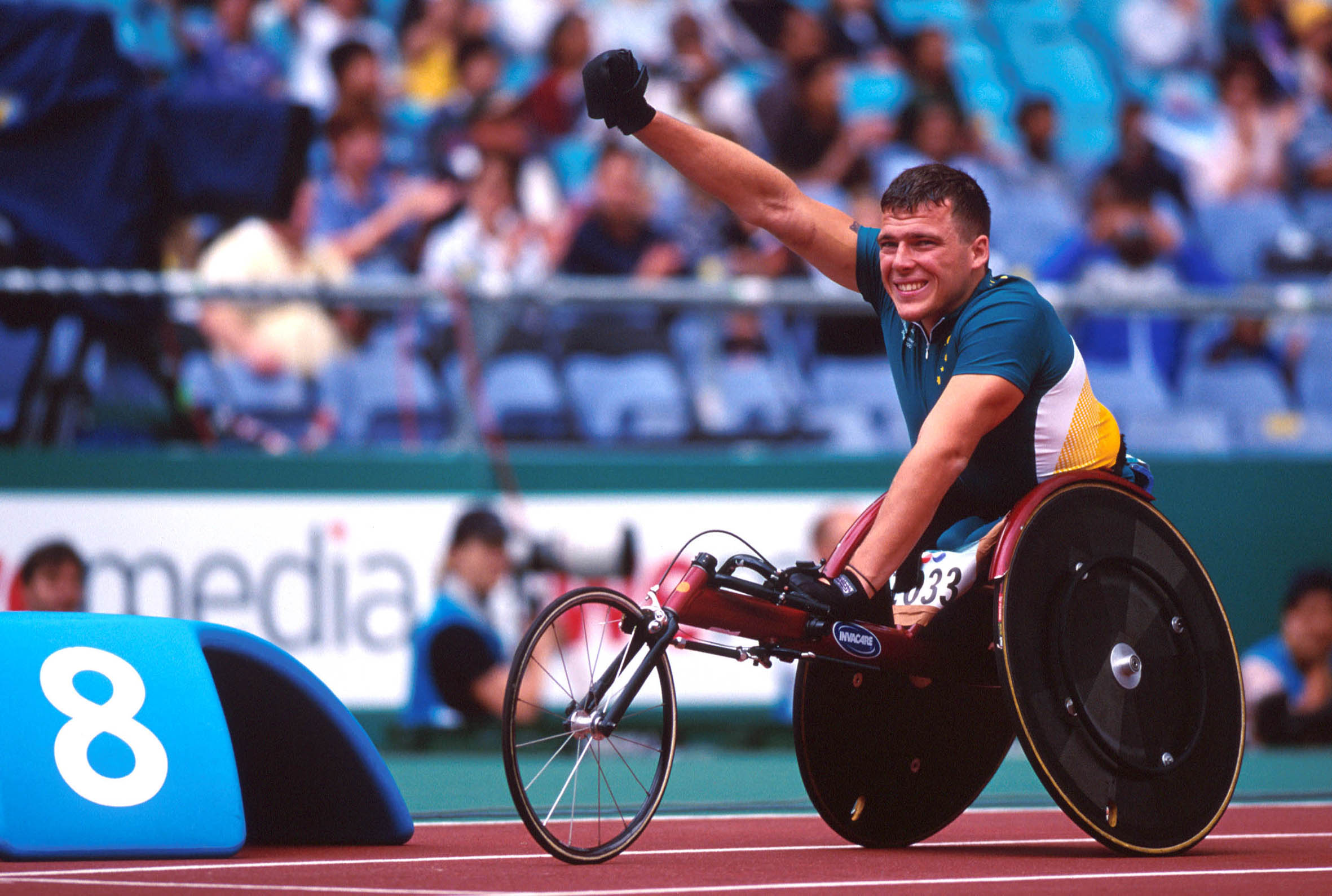
Fearnley waving to crowd at 2000 Sydney Paralympics

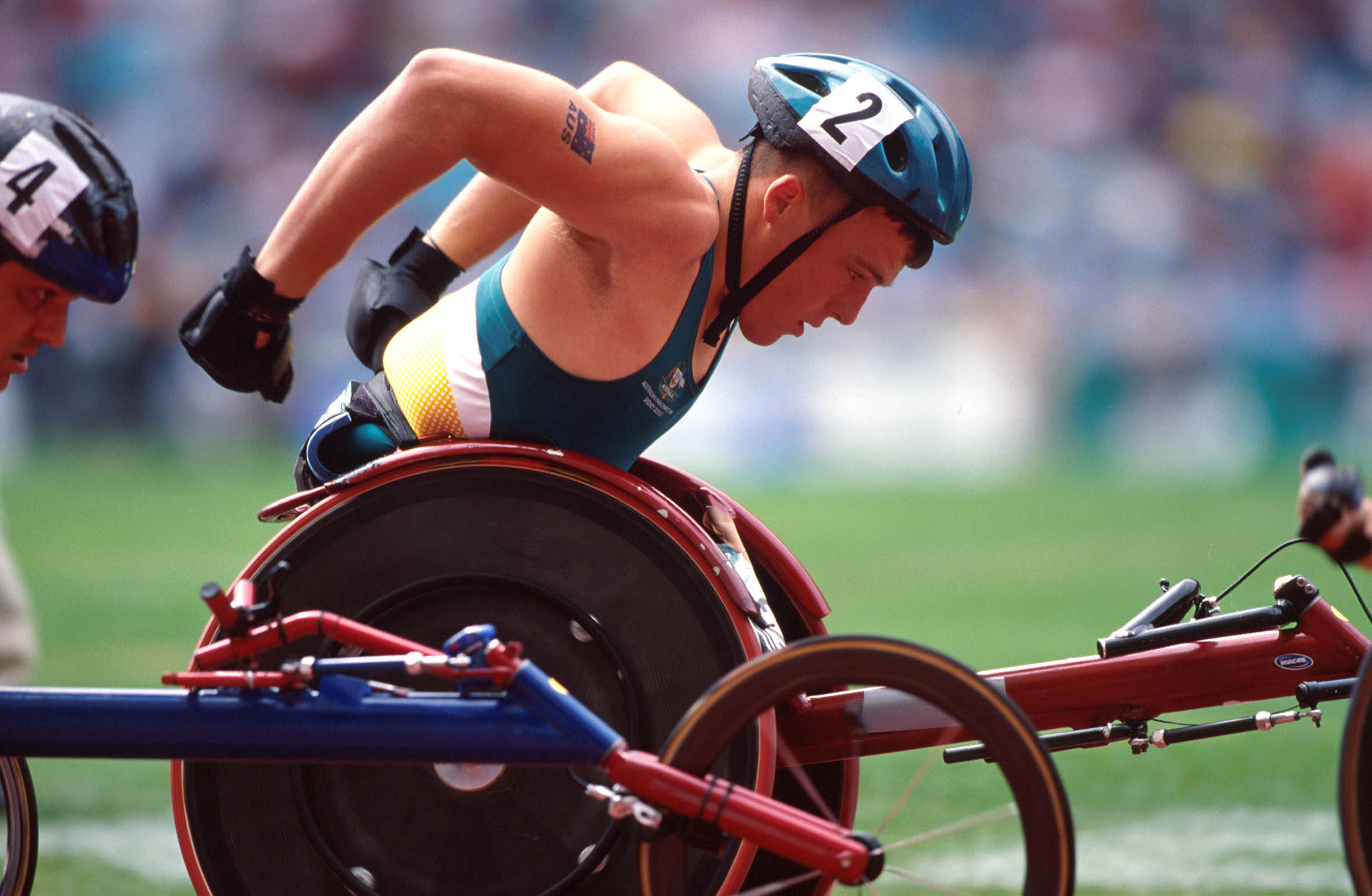
Fearnley racing at 2000 Sydney Paralympics

In 1997, Fearnley was a member of the Western Region Academy of Sport and by the 2000 Sydney Paralympics was representing Australia. At these Games, Fearnley won two silver medals in the 800 m and 4×100 m relay events. He also represented his country in the demonstration sport of Men's 1500 m wheelchair, where he came 4th. He went to the 2002 IPC Athletics World Championships in Birmingham, England and finished 7th in both the 400 m and 800 m T54 events.

At the 2004 Olympic Games, he finished 5th in the demonstration sport of Men's 1500 m wheelchair. Following this he won two gold medals in the 5000 m T54 and marathon T54 events at the 2004 Athens Paralympics, for which he received a Medal of the Order of Australia. At the 2006 IPC Athletics World Championships in Assen, Netherlands, he won three gold medals and one bronze medal. Participating in his third Paralympics in Beijing, he won a gold medal in the marathon T54, two silver medals in the 800 m T54 and 5000 m T54 events and a bronze medal in the 1500 m T54 event.

On 30 September 2009, Fearnley conducted a training climb of Sydney's Centrepoint Tower's 1,504 fire stairs in 20 minutes, taking them two at a time. While far short of the 6m 52s record for the annual charity climb (Sydney Tower Run-up), the Tower's manager said this was quicker than the 25 minutes required by most able-bodied people. In 2009, he won his fourth New York City Marathon title, his third consecutive title in the Chicago Marathon and victories in Seoul, Paris, London and Sydney. In November 2009, Fearnley crawled the Kokoda Trail accompanied by family and friends in support of Movember and Beyond Blue. He completed the 96-kilometre (60 mi) journey in 10 days. In 2009, he was awarded the Young Australian of the Year for New South Wales.

Fearnley is active in advocacy work, and has been an ambassador for the Don't DIS my ABILITY campaign for four years. He was also a 2010 International Day of People with Disability Ambassador. In 2010, Fearnley competed again in the New York marathon, which he came in third. In the same year his image was featured on the medal for the 2010 Blackmores Sydney Running Festival. He also won a gold medal at the 2010 Delhi Commonwealth Games in the 1500 m T54 event.

In early 2011 at the IPC Athletics World Championships in Christchurch, New Zealand, he won the marathon. Later in the year, Fearnley competed in the 2011 Sydney to Hobart Yacht Race.

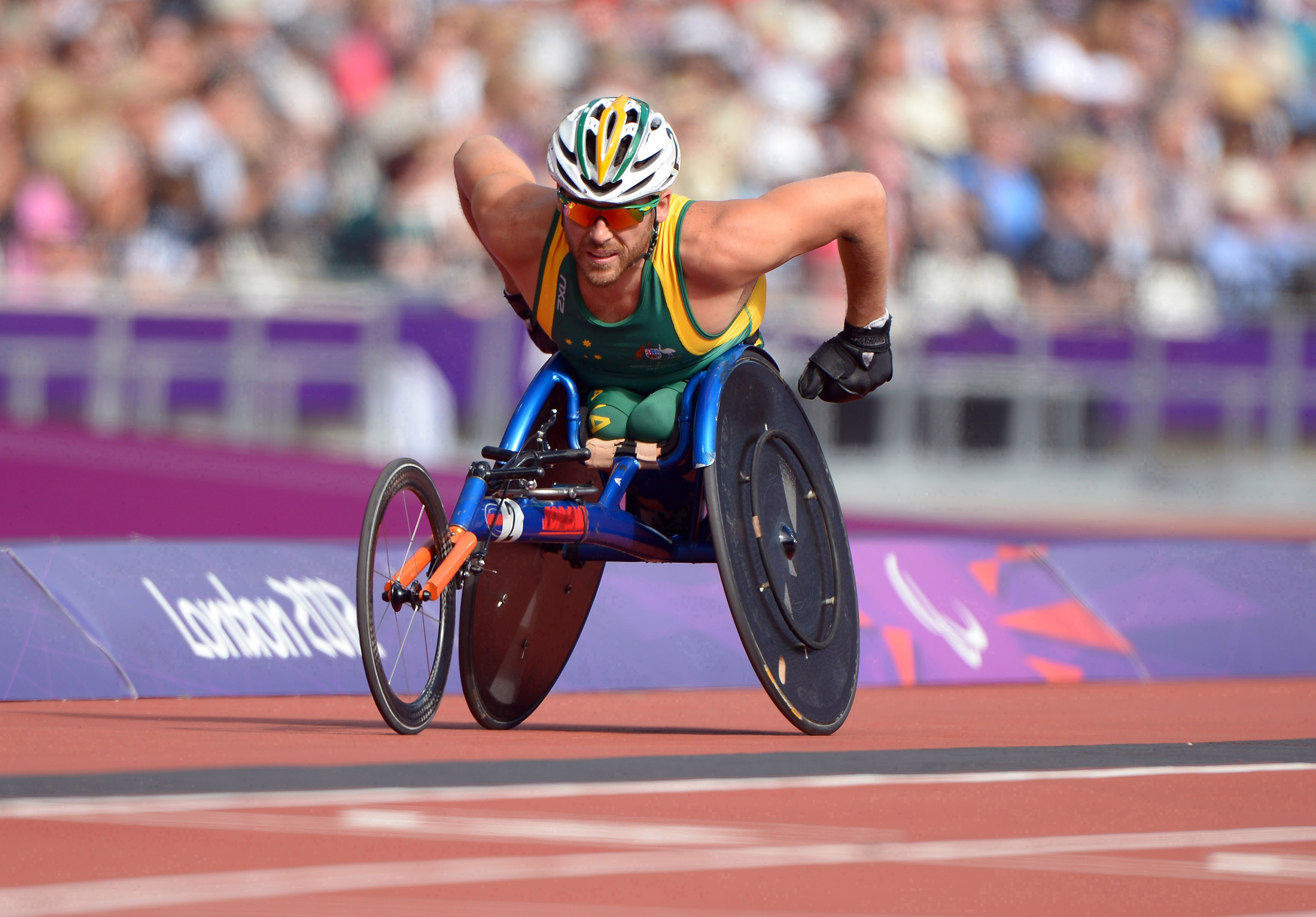
Fearnley racing at 2012 London Paralympics

At the 2012 London Paralympics, he was aiming to be the first person to win three consecutive marathon T54 gold medals. However, he instead won a bronze medal in the Men's Marathon T54 and a silver medal in the Men's 5000 m T54.

Fearnley won a bronze medal in the 1500 m T54 at the 2014 Glasgow Commonwealth Games; he had been fighting a virus in the days before the event. In November 2014, he won his fifth New York Marathon men's wheelchair event. After the competition, he stated "That was one of the toughest races of my life" due to the high winds that nearly forced the cancellation of the wheelchair event.

At the 2015 IPC Athletics World Championships in Doha, he finished fourth in the Men's 5000 m T54 and did not progress to the final of the Men's 1500 m T54. He left Doha immediately to compete in the New York Marathon where he finished fifth after crashing at the 12-mile mark. On Australia Day 2016, he won the Oz Day 10K Wheelchair Road Race for the tenth time joining Louise Sauvage as a ten-time winner of this prestigious wheelchair road race.

Throughout 2015, Fearnley co-established and co-hosted the groundbreaking live online “All Sports Show” in his home town of Newcastle and polished his skills front of the camera with fellow co-hosts sports administrator Ivan Spyrdz, distinguished journalist Brett Keeble and local sports star and former NRL player Darren Forward.

At his last Paralympics in Rio de Janeiro in 2016, Fearnley won the silver medal in the Men's Marathon T54 and the bronze medal in the Men's 5000 m T53/54. Fearnley indicated he will race in the wheelchair marathon at the 2018 Gold Coast Commonwealth Games and continue to race marathons on the international circuit. At the end of the marathon, Fearnley said: "One of my biggest strengths is that I deal with discomfort better than most."

At the 2017 World Para Athletics Championships in London, England, Fearnley finished sixth in both the Men's 1500 m and 5000 m T54 events.

At the 2018 Gold Coast Commonwealth Games, Fearnley won the gold medal in the Men's Marathon T54 and silver in the Men's 1500 T54. He was given the honour of the flag bearer at the closing ceremony.

Fearnley was coached by Andrew Dawes at the New South Wales Institute of Sport.

In 2020 Fearnley continued his media career, joining the Australian Broadcasting Corporation to host a long form television interview program Kurt Fearnley's One Plus One.

== Media career ==
After his retirement, Fearnley has been involved in media projects including:

- Kurt Fearnley's Tiny Island podcast
- Hosting ABC's One Plus One from 2020 onward
- Hosting SBS's What Does Australia Really Think About Disability? in 2021
- Provided the voice of the Television Commentator character on the Australian animated preschool television series Bluey

== Boards ==
Fearnley's extensive experience in disability sport has led him to be appointed to several boards.

- Australian Volunteers International 2015–2016
- Australia Day Council of NSW
- National Disability Insurance Scheme's Independent Advisory Council 2013–2016
- International Paralympic Committee Athletes Council 2016–2022
- Australian Paralympic Committee 2016–2019, vice-chairman 2019
- Newcastle Permanent Charitable Foundation 2018–present
- Australian Sports Commission 2019–2024
- Brisbane Organising Committee for the 2032 Olympic and Paralympic Games, Paralympics Australia athlete representative
- National Disability Insurance Agency Chair 2022–present 2021–present

== Awards and recognition ==
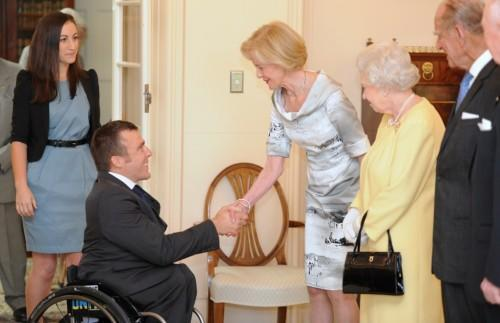
Fearnley meetsing Quentin Bryce and The Queen at Government House, Canberra, in 2011

- 2005 – Medal of the Order of Australia (OAM)
- 2007 – New South Wales Institute of Sport Athlete of the Year
- 2007 – Western Region Academy Hall of fame inductee
- 2007 – Confederation of Australian Sport Athlete of the Year with a Disability
- 2007 – New South Wales Sports Federation Athlete of the Year
- 2007 – Laureus World Sports Awards finalist
- 2009 – New South Wales Young Australian of the Year
- 2009 – Laureus World Sports Awards finalist
- 2011 – The Age's Sport Performer Award in the Performer with a Disability nominee
- 2014 – Sydney Olympic Park Athletic Centre Path of Champions inductee
- 2014 – AIS Sport Performance Awards – Sport Personality of the Year
- 2016 – Centennial Park's visitor hub was officially named Fearnley Grounds
- 2016 – Team Captain with Daniela Di Toro – Australian Team at the 2016 Rio Paralympics
- 2018 – Australian flag bearer at the 2018 Commonwealth Games closing ceremony
- 2018 – Officer of the Order of Australia (AO) for distinguished service to people with a disability, as a supporter of, and fundraiser for indigenous athletics and charitable organisations, and as a Paralympic athlete.
- 2018 – Sport Australia Hall of Fame 'Don Award' – the award recognises the sporting achievement of the year which has inspired the people of Australia. He was the first athlete with a disability to win the award. The Don Award has been claimed to be Australian sport's "highest honour".
- 2018 – GQ Sporting Legend
- 2019 – New South Wales Australian of the Year
- 2018 – AIS Sport Performance Awards – ABC Best Sporting Moment of The Year
- 2019 – Kurt Fearnley Scholarship established by Commonwealth Games Australia and the Carbine Club of NSW to assist talented individual Para-sport athletes in NSW
- 2019 – Patron for International Day of People with Disability.
- 2020 – a river-class ferry on the Sydney Ferries network was named in his honour
- 2021 – New York Road Runners (NYRR) Hall of Fame
- 2022 – Paralympics Australia Hall of Fame
- 2022 – New South Wales Institute of Sport 'Most Outstanding'
- 2023 – Sport Australia Hall of Fame inductee
