= Abia State Ministry of Commerce and Industry =

Ministry overview
- Jurisdiction: Government of Abia State
- Headquarters: State Government House, Umuahia, Abia State, Nigeria
- Ministry executives: Chisom Nwamuo, Commissioner; Ernest Onyeuku, Permanent Secretary

The Abia State Ministry of Commerce and Industry is one of the branches of the Abia State Government. The body aims to foster a stable and sustainable economic growth by promoting private sector development in its free market economy.

== See also ==
- Abia State Government
