= Umuokpara =

Igbo clan in Umuahia, Abia State, Nigeria

Umuopara is a clan of the Igbo people of Umuahia, Abia State, Nigeria. it's one of the five clans that make up Umuahia (The Capital City of Abia State). Umuopara lies on the western border of Abia with Imo State. The natural boundaries between the Umuopara of Umuahia, Abia State and its Umungwa and Udo-Mbaise neighbours both in Imo state is the Imo River.

The Umuopara reside in seven villages known as umunne asaa: Ezeleke, Ogbodiukwu, Ekenobizi, Ehume, Ogbodinibe, Umuihi and Umunwawa.

== Culture ==
Umuopara is generally regarded as the cradle of Umuahia civilization. It was known for the Egwu festival celebrated at Omaegwu. Umuopara later became known for the Ekpe festival which is also celebrated by Ibeku and Ohuhu clans in Umuahia. The first ever Ekpe festival took place in Ogbodiukwu Umuopara. The new Yam festival is also celebrated in Umuopara. The supreme deity in Umuopara during pre-colonial times was Ojam. Most of the modern-day residents are Christians, predominantly Methodist and Anglican. Assemblies of God is the foremost Pentecostal denomination in Nigeria. It began in Umuahia and is gaining ground in Umuopara.

== Origin ==
Several beliefs describe the origin of Umuopara people. One view is that the Umuopara people did not migrate from anywhere. Some villages in Umuopara today trace their origin to places outside Umuopara.

It has been suggested that at least sections of the people of Umuopara came from Obowu and Mbaise areas.

According to oral traditions Eku was the ancestor of the people of Umuopara. Eku had two sons namely Opara who became the founder of Umuopara and Ibe who founded Ibeku. Omaegwu in Umuopara was his first point of settlement. As the first son Opara remained while Ibe moved east. Nkwoegwu in present-day Ohuhu clan was a meeting point for the two brothers during the annual Egwu festival. This was before later migrations from Obowu area by the Ohuhu people. Some sons of Ibe later moved further east to establish Abam, Ohafia and Edda.

Meanwhile, The traditions of origin of the Umuopara people are like those of most other Igbo Societies with diverse views on how the people came to be. These views usually seem contradictory and conflicting with regard to one epical father fathering all of the constituent units.

== Sources ==
- "Umuahia | Location, Facts, & Population". Encyclopedia Britannica.
- City Ng Umuahia
