= Abia State High Court of Justice =

The Abia State High Court of Justice is the highest and central court of Abia State located in Umuahia, the state's capital city. It has supreme authority than the Magistrate's courts and Customary courts in handling and determining major cases. It is headed by a Chief Judge who is appointed by the Governor on recommendation from the National Judicial Council and subject to confirmation by the Abia State House of Assembly.

== See also ==
- Abia State Judiciary
- Government of Abia State
