= Chidi =

Chidi may refer to:

- Chidi (god), an ancient Chinese deity

== People ==
=== Given name ===
- Chidi Ahanotu, American football player
- Chidi Edeh, Nigerian footballer
- Chidi Imoh, Nigerian sprinter
- Chidi Iwuoma, American football player
- Chidi Kwubiri, Nigerian-German visual artist
- Chidi Ngwaba, British medical doctor
- Chidi Nwanu, Nigerian footballer
- Chidi Odiah, Nigerian footballer
- Chidi Onyemah, Nigerian footballer
- Chidi Osondu, Nigerian-American record producer and songwriter
- Chidi (Haihaya-Vrṣhni ruler), mythological Indian ruler

=== Surname ===
- Lovina Sylvia Chidi, Nigerian and German chess player
- Pascal Chidi (born 2000), Nigerian footballer

=== Fictional characters ===
- Chidi Anagonye, a fictional character on the U.S. TV series The Good Place

== See also ==
- Chedli
