= Politics of Abia State =

Political system of Abia State

Abia State has a multi-party political system. The politics of Abia State is governed within the framework of a presidential republic with the Governor of Abia State serving jointly as the head-of-state and head of government. The Governor exercises the executive power vested on him or her directly, although the constitution also authorizes the Deputy Governor and Commissioners to carry out such exercises. Legislative power rests on the shoulders of a 24-member unicameral House of Assembly while the judicial power is exercised directly by the Judiciary of Abia State. Power in Abia State is divided into three branches: executive, legislative and judiciary, similarly to the United States.

== Political parties ==
Since Nigeria switched to a democratic system of government in 1999, only one party, the People's Democratic Party (PDP) has dominated the political system of Abia State. It is followed by the All Progressives Grand Alliance (APGA) and All Progressives Congress (APC). Qualified candidates who seek to be elected into the executive, legislative and local government councils are selected by these parties along with several other minor parties.

== See also ==
- Government of Abia State
- Nigerian National Assembly delegation from Abia
- Abia State
