= St Pius X College =

St Pius X College may refer to:

- Saint Pius X College, Bodo City, in Nigeria
- St Pius X College, Magherafelt, in Northern Ireland
- St Pius X College, Sydney, in Australia
