= St. Pius X (disambiguation) =

St. Pius X was a pope who was canonized.

St. Pius X may also refer to:

== Parishes ==
- Saint Pius X Catholic Church, a parish in Dublin, Ireland
- Saint Pius X Catholic Church, a parish in Honolulu, Hawaii
- St. Pius X Catholic Church, a parish in Rock Island, Illinois; in the Roman Catholic Diocese of Peoria, Illinois
- St. Pius X Catholic Church, a parish in Santa Fe Springs, California
- St. Pius X Catholic Church, a parish in Lombard, Illinois

== Schools ==
Africa

- Saint Pius X College, Bodo City, a secondary school in Rivers State, Nigeria

Asia

- St. Pius X College, Rajapuram, a tertiary college in Rajapuram, Maloth, Kasaragod, India
- St. Pius X Minor Seminary, a preparatory seminary in North Namizabad, Pakistan
- St. Pius X Seminary, a secondary school in Roxas City, Philippines

Australia and New Zealand

- St. Pius X College, a secondary school in Sydney, Australia
- St. Pius X School, New Plymouth, a primary school in New Plymouth, New Zealand

Canada

- St. Pius X High School (Ottawa), a secondary school in Ottawa, Canada
- A Catholic elementary school in Runnymede, Ontario
- An elementary school in Tecumseh, Ontario

Europe

- International Seminary of Saint Pius X, a theological seminary for the Society of Saint Pius X in Écône, Valais, Switzerland.
- Saint Pius X Catholic High School, Rotherham, a secondary school in Rotherham, England
- St Pius X College, Magherafelt, a secondary school in Northern Ireland
- St. Pius X National School, a primary school in Dublin, Ireland
- A Catholic primary school in Middlesbrough, England

United States

- St. Pius X Parish School, Santa Fe Springs, California
- Saint Pius X Catholic High School (Kansas City, Missouri), a secondary school in Missouri
- Saint Pius X High School (Lower Pottsgrove Township, Pennsylvania), a secondary school in Pennsylvania
- St. Pius X Catholic High School (DeKalb County, Georgia), a secondary school in Georgia
- St. Pius X High School (Albuquerque), a secondary school in New Mexico
- St. Pius X High School (Crystal City, Missouri), a secondary school in Missouri
- St. Pius X High School (Houston, Texas), a secondary school in Texas
- St. Pius X Minor Seminary (Galt, California), a former minor seminary in the Diocese of Sacramento
- St. Pius X School, a primary school in South Yarmouth, Massachusetts
- St. Pius X School of Liturgical Music, a former music school in New York City
- St. Pius X School, Chula Vista, a primary school in California
- St. Pius X Seminary (Dubuque, Iowa), Minor seminary associated with Loras College, Dubuque, Iowa
- A Catholic middle school in St. Joseph County, Indiana, located in the Roman Catholic Diocese of Fort Wayne-South Bend
- A primary and middle school in Cedar Mill, Oregon.

== Other ==
- Society of St. Pius X, a traditionalist branch of the Holy Ghost Fathers
