= Abia State Ministry of Agriculture =

Ministry overview
- Jurisdiction: Government of Abia State
- Headquarters: State Government House, Umuahia, Abia State, Nigeria
- Ministry executive: Dr Cliff Agbaeze, Commissioner

The Abia State Ministry of Agriculture is a branch of the Abia State Government. It is the apex body for the formulation and administration of the rules and regulations and laws relating to agriculture in Abia State.

== See also ==
- Abia State Government
