= Abia State Ministry of Culture and Tourism =

Ministry overview
- Formed: August 2010
- Jurisdiction: Government of Abia State
- Headquarters: State Government House, Umuahia, Abia State, Nigeria

The Abia State Ministry of Culture and Tourism is an Abia State Government ministry established in August 2010 as the body that is concerned with the administration of tourism and cultural affairs in Abia State.

== See also ==
- Government of Abia State
