= Abia State Ministry of Information and Strategy =

Ministry overview
- Jurisdiction: Government of Abia State
- Headquarters: State Government House, Umuahia, Abia State, Nigeria
- Ministry executive: Eze Chikamnayo, Commissioner

The Abia State Ministry of Information and Strategy is the state government ministry that informs the public about government policy plans and implementation and supports improvements to knowledge and education of the public.

== See also ==
- Abia State Government
