= Abia State Ministry of Housing =

Ministry overview
- Jurisdiction: Government of Abia State
- Headquarters: State Government House, Umuahia, Abia State, Nigeria
- Ministry executive: Commissioner

The Abia State Ministry of Housing is an Abia State Government ministry responsible for policies on public housing and spatial planning in Abia State. It is located in Umuahia, the state's capital.

K. O. Mgbeahuru was the Commissioner of Housing in the government of Theodore Orji (2007-2015).

== History ==
In July 2026, the Nigerian Society of Engineers (NSE) called for collaboration with Abia State Ministry of Housing to improve house development in the state.

== See also ==
- Abia State Government
