= Abia State Ministry of Health =

Ministry overview
- Jurisdiction: Government of Abia State
- Headquarters: State Government House, Umuahia, Abia State, Nigeria
- Ministry executive: Prof Enoch Uche, Commissioner

The Abia State Ministry of Health is the ministerial body of the Abia State Government charged with the responsibility of implementing government policy on health by providing information, raising health awareness and standardized education, ensuring the accessibility of health services, and monitoring the quality of health services provided to citizens and visitors in Abia State.

== See also ==
- Abia State Government
