= Abia State Ministry of Finance and Economic Development =

Ministry overview
- Jurisdiction: Government of Abia State
- Headquarters: State Government House, Umuahia, Abia State, Nigeria
- Ministry executive: Philip Nto, Commissioner

The Abia State Ministry of Finance and Economic Development is an Abia State Government ministerial body responsible for general financial management and economic policy of Abia State.

== See also ==
- Abia State Government
