= Maurice Iwu =

Nigerian pharmacognosist

Maurice Mmaduakolam Iwu

3rd Chairman of the Independent National Electoral Commission
- In office June 2005 – 28 April 2010
- Preceded by: Abel Guobadia
- Succeeded by: Attahiru Jega

Personal details
- Born: 21 April 1950 (age 76) Umukabia, Ehime Mbano, Imo State, Nigeria
- Occupation: Pharmacist
- Awards: US National Research International Prize for Ethnobiology (1999)

Maurice Mmaduakolam Iwu (born 21 April 1950) is a Nigerian professor of pharmacognosy and the chairman of Independent National Electoral Commission (INEC) from June 2005 to April 2010.

== Background ==
Maurice Mmaduakolam Iwu was born on 21 April 1950, in Umuezeala, Umukabia, Ehime Mbano in Imo State. He attended Saint Pius X College, Bodo-Ogoni for his secondary education. He studied at the University of Bradford, England, receiving a master's degree in pharmacy in 1976, and a Ph.D. in 1978. He was a World Health Organization (WHO) visiting scholar to Dyson Perrins Laboratory, University of Oxford (1980), Fulbright senior scholar, Ohio State University and won the U.S. National Research International Prize for ethnobiology in 1999. He was a professor of pharmacognosy at the University of Nigeria, Nsukka (1984–1993).

== Career ==
Entering business, Iwu became vice-president, research and development of Tom's of Maine, a personal care manufacturing company, and member of the board of directors, Axxon Biopharm Inc. He served on the board of InterCEDD, Fund for integrated Rural Development and Traditional Medicine, and Center for Economic and Social Justice. He was the United Nations' lead consultant for the development of Nigeria's National Biodiversity Strategy and Action Plan. Iwu has published more than 100 research articles and is the author of four books.

Iwu was president of the International Society of ethnobiology (1996–2002), member and ex-president of the Nigerian Society of Pharmacognosy, Member of the American Society of Tropical Medicine and Hygiene and member of the International Society for Medicinal Plant Research. He was the executive director, Bioresources Development and Conservation Program and a senior research associate at the Division of Experimental Therapeutics of Walter Reed Army Institute of Research, Washington D.C.

=== INEC ===
Iwu was appointed INEC commissioner for Imo State in August 2003, by President Olusegun Obasanjo. In June 2005, he succeeded Abel Guobadia as Chairman of INEC. Soon after being appointed, Iwu announced that foreign monitors would not be allowed during elections, but only foreign election observers. This decision was condemned by politicians and civil society groups who called for his immediate removal from office.

In December 2008, Abubakar Rimi called on Maurice Iwu, to resign from office, citing irregularities in the previous presidential election. Michael Aondoakaa, the Attorney General, opposed sacking Maurice Iwu despite criticism of Iwu's conduct of the 2007 elections.

In March 2009, the vice-chairman of Senate Committee on the Independent National Electoral Commission (INEC) Maina Maaji Lawan spoke against a motion that questioned the integrity of INEC Chairman Maurice Iwu. Iwu's tenure was due to expire on 13 June 2010. However, on 28 April 2010, Acting President Goodluck Jonathan, who has committed himself to pursuing electoral reform, removed Iwu from office.

== Selected bibliography ==
Iwu's published academic papers.

=== Books ===
- Maurice M. Iwu (1993). Handbook of African medicinal plants. CRC Press. ISBN 0-8493-4266-X.
- Maurice M. Iwu; Jacqueline C. Wootton (2002). Ethnomedicine and drug discovery. Elsevier. ISBN 0-444-50852-X.
- Maurice M. Iwu (1986). African ethnomedicine: based on a seminar delivered at Institute for Medical Research, Yaba, Lagos, February 10, 1982. UPS. ISBN 978-2538-08-6.
- Maurice M. Iwu (1997). Commercial production of indigenous plants as phytomedicines and cosmetics. Bio-resources Development and Conservation Programme Press. ISBN 0-9653292-0-8.
