= Abia State Ministry of Environment =

Abia State Environment guardians

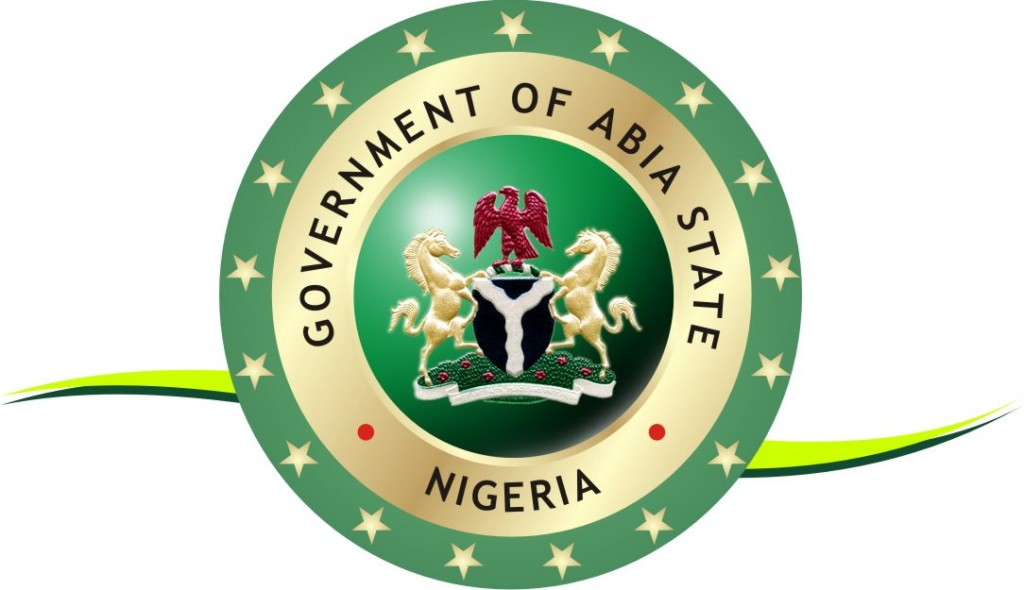

Ministry overview
- Jurisdiction: Government of Abia State
- Headquarters: State Government House, Umuahia, Abia State, Nigeria
- Ministry executive: Chinwe Nwanganga, Commissioner

The Abia State Ministry of Environment is an Abia State Government ministry responsible for developing and implementing policies, programs and legislation in order to protect and conserve the environment of Abia State for sustainable development.

== Structure ==
The state government appoint a commissioner, who leads the ministry. The commissioner is supported by various directors and departments working under him in various aspects of environment management.

== Environmental sanitation ==
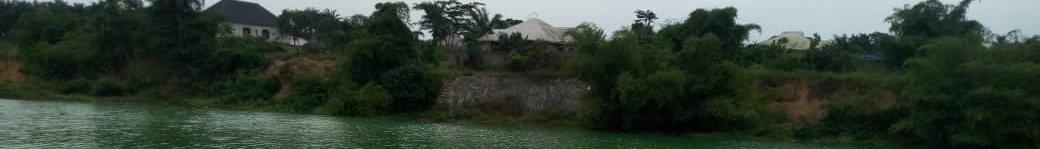
Azumini Blue River in Aba, Abia state, Nigeria

The Abia State Ministry of Environment tasked the citizens of the state to maintain a clean environment to maintain a healthy environment; this was made known on the World Environmental Day 2024 celebration.

=== Prohibition of styrofoam foil ===
The Abia State Ministry of Environment banned the use of Styrofoam foil in the state. The decision was taken to protect the environment from pollution and the effects of the foil on the environment.

== See also ==
- Abia State Government
