= Eme Okoro =

Nigerian politician

Eme Okoro is a Nigerian politician of the People's Democratic Party who currently serves as the Secretary to the State Government in Abia State after he was appointed by Okezie Ikpeazu on 3 June 2015 succeeding Mkpa Agu Mkpa.

== See also ==
- Abia State Government
