= Magnus L. Kpakol =

Nigeria economist

Magnus Lekara Kpakol
- Born: Magnus Lekara Kpakol; River state
- Citizenship: Nigeria
- Education: Saint Pius X College, Bodo City
- Occupation: Economist

Magnus Lekara Kpakol is a Nigerian American educator who is the CEO, Chairman and Chief Strategist at the Economic and Business Strategies. He is the principal leadership, management and business coach/trainer at the Economic and Business Strategies Ltd. He was the principal consultant at VIJONS International in Dallas Texas and a visiting professor of economics at the University of Dallas, where he taught economic development and international economics before being appointed in 2001 as Chief economic adviser to the president of Nigeria by President Olusegun Obasanjo.

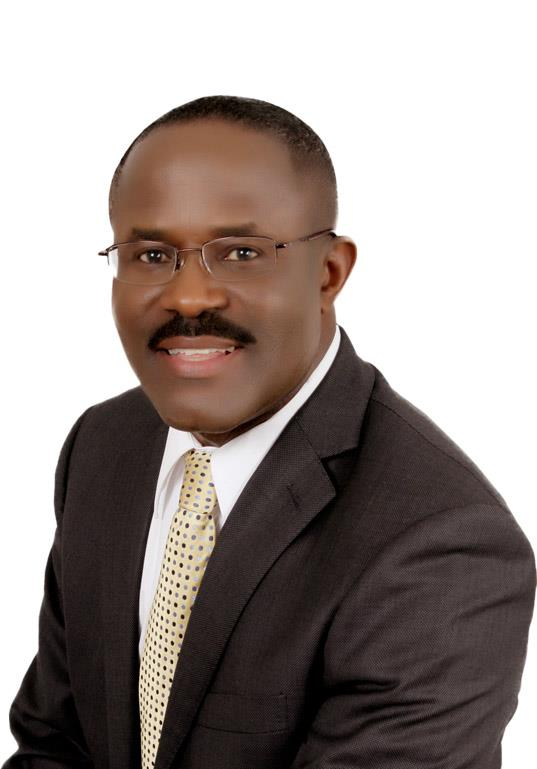
Magnus L. Kpakol

== Early life and education ==
Magnus Lekara Kpakol was born in B. Dere, Gokana in Rivers State of Nigeria. He attended Saint Pius X College, Bodo City, and Baptist High School, Port Harcourt before leaving for the United States as a teenager in the mid 1970s. He obtained a Bachelor of Science Degree from the University of Wisconsin, (1978); did graduate studies in Economics and Industrial Relations at the University of Minnesota, Minneapolis and in 1982, obtained a Master of Science Degree in Labor Economics and Industrial Relations at the University of North Texas in Denton. In 1983 he received an M.A. in Political Economy from the University of Texas at Dallas from where in 1988 he also obtained a PhD in political economy, specializing in economic development and international economics.

== Career ==
=== Public Sector Service ===
Kpakol served in Nigeria's Federal Executive Council as Chief Economic Adviser to President Olusegun Obasanjo. In this role, he was also the vice chairman and CEO of the National Planning Commission, where he worked with the minister of finance and the governor of the Central Bank on national fiscal and monetary policies.

Subsequently, he was appointed National Coordinator of the National Poverty Eradication Program (NAPEP). His administration at NAPEP was noted for developing several key initiatives, including a Conditional Cash Transfer (CCT) program known as COPE, the Village Economic Development Solutions (Village Solutions), and the Promise Keeper Partnership (PKP) for faith-based organizations.

=== Academia and Private Sector ===
Before his work with the Nigerian government, Kpakol was a senior economist in the Planning & Research department of the JCPenney Company in Plano, Texas.

He also has an extensive academic background, having served as a visiting professor of economics at the University of Dallas, where he taught courses including economic development, international economics, and global business in its Graduate School of Business. He also taught doctoral-level economic development at the University of North Texas and was an adjunct lecturer at North Lake College.

=== Current Activities ===
Kpakol is the chairman and CEO of the Economic Growth and Development Center (Economic Center), an international organization focused on poverty eradication, entrepreneurship, and human capital development. He is also the chairman and CEO of Economic and Business Strategies (EBS) Ltd., a management consulting company.

Through EBS, he produces and hosts the international talk show Magnus Kpakol gvA. His company also developed the One Shout Security App, a mobile application that allows users to send emergency alerts and their location to selected contacts.

=== Other Civic and Professional Activities ===
Kpakol has served as a consultant to the United Nations Development Program (UNDP). He was also a member of the Board of Trustees of John Brown University in Siloam Springs, Arkansas. He is also a member of several professional organizations, including the American Economic Association, the National Association for Business Economics (NABE), and the Dallas Economists’ Club.
