= Bright Esieme =

Nigerian footballer (1992–2024)

Personal information
- Date of birth: 4 October 1992
- Place of birth: Umuahia, Nigeria
- Date of death: 8 April 2024 (aged 31)
- Height: 1.86 m (6 ft 1 in)
- Position: Defender

Senior career*
Years	Team	Apps	(Gls)
2010–2012	ABS		
2013–2015	Enyimba		
2016–2017	Enugu Rangers		
2018	Niger Tornadoes		
2019	Abia Comets		
2020	Enyimba		

International career
2014	Nigeria	4	(0)
Medal record
Men's football
Representing Nigeria
African Nations Championship
Bronze medal – third place	2014 South Africa	Team
- * Club domestic league appearances and goals

Bright Esieme (4 October 1992 – 8 April 2024) was a Nigerian professional footballer who played as a defender. He died from a brief illness on 8 April 2024, at the age of 31.

== Club career ==
He played for ABS, Enyimba, Enugu Rangers, Niger Tornadoes and Abia Comets.

== International career ==
In January 2014, coach Stephen Keshi invited him to the Nigeria 23-man team for the 2014 African Nations Championship. He helped the team defeat Zimbabwe 1–0 for a third-place finish.
