= Jerry Eze =

Nigerian pastor and televangelist (born 1982)

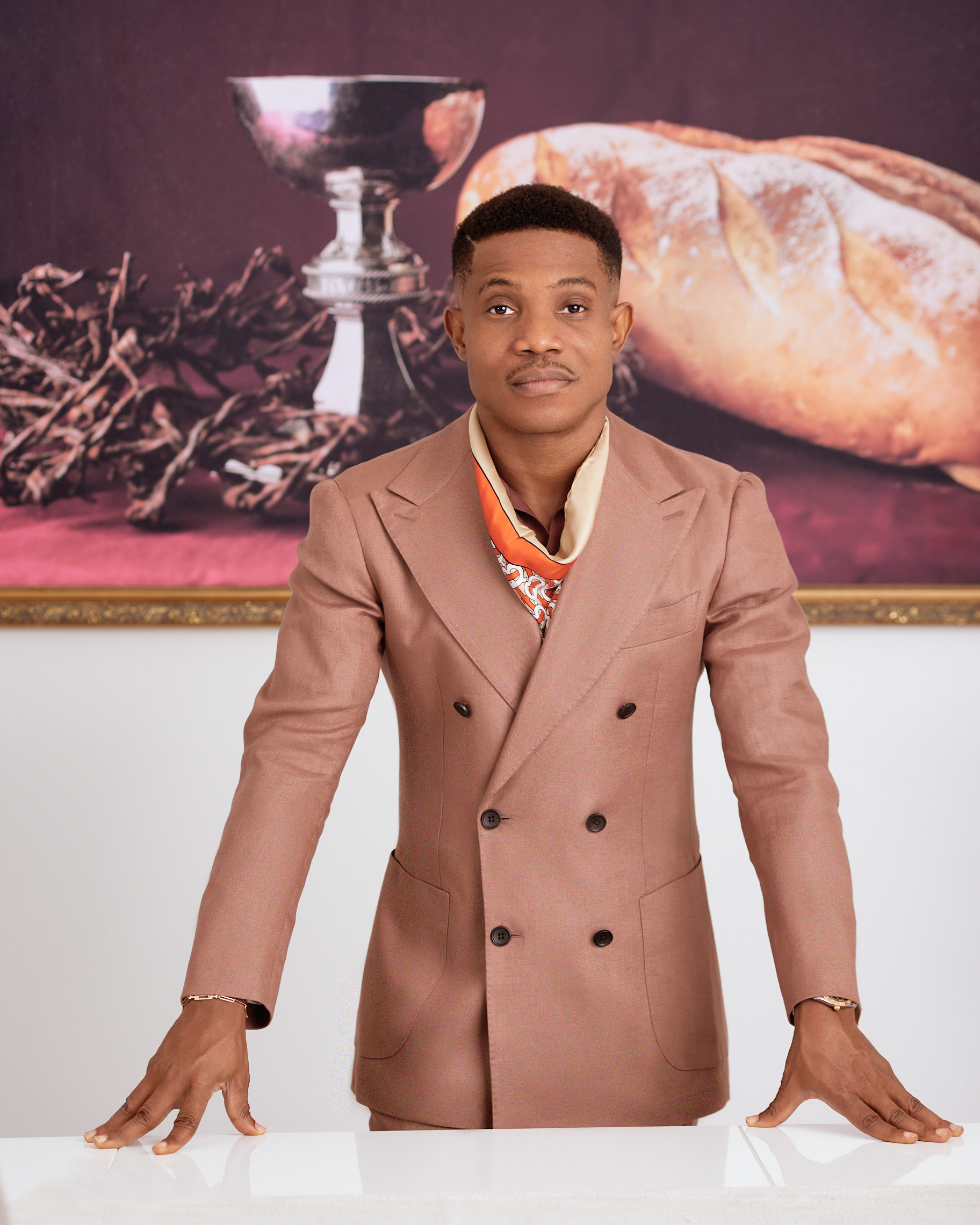

Personal life
- Born: Jerry Uchechukwu Eze; 22 August 1982 (age 44) Umuahia, Abia State, Nigeria
- Spouse: Eno Jerry
- Known for: New Season Prophetic Prayers and Declarations (NSPPD)
- Occupation: Pastor

Religious life
- Religion: Christian
- Church: Streams of Joy International

Senior posting
- Based in: Abuja, Nigeria

Jerry Uchechukwu Eze (born 22 August 1982) is a Nigerian Pentecostal pastor. He is the founder and Lead Pastor of Streams of Joy International, and the convener of the New Season Prophetic Prayers and Declaration (NSPPD), an online digital prayer platform on YouTube.

== Early life ==
Eze was born on 22 August 1982 in Umuahia, Abia State, Nigeria. He attended Ibeku High School, Umuahia from 1991 to 1997. He further obtained a bachelor's degree in history and international relations from Abia State University, and a postgraduate degree in business administration from the Enugu State University of Science and Technology.

After his education, Eze worked as a communications specialist with the World Bank project for HIV/AIDS and United Nations Population Fund before becoming a full-time pastor. He married Eno Jerry on 17 March 2007. The couple has two children; a girl, Samara; and a boy, Jerry.

== Ministry ==
Eze started his ministry in 2009 at All Saints Chapel, Abia State University (ABSU), Uturu, Abia State. In 2013, he founded and began the Stream of Joy International Church in Umuahia, Abia State.

Following the COVID-19 pandemic, Eze started an online prayer session called "New Season Prophetic Prayers and Declarations", popularly called NSPPD, which he hosts on YouTube, Facebook, Instagram, TikTok, and Mixlr. In January 2026, Jerry Eze rolled out grants worth hundreds of thousands of dollars for young entrepreneurs.
