= Abel Guobadia =

Nigerian diplomat

2nd Chairman of the Independent National Electoral Commission
- In office 2000 – May 2005
- Preceded by: Ephraim Akpata
- Succeeded by: Maurice Iwu

Personal details
- Born: 28 June 1932 Benin City, Nigeria
- Died: 4 February 2011 (aged 78)

Sir Abel Guobadia OFR (28 June 1932 – 4 February 2011) was an educator, administrator, diplomat and retired public servant.

== Education ==
Guobadia was born on 28 June 1932, in Benin City, Nigeria. He attended C.M.S. Primary School in Benin City (1939–1945); Government College, Ibadan (1946–1951); University College Ibadan (1952–1957). In 1962, he won a scholarship for graduate studies in the United States of America and was awarded the Ph.D. in solid-state physics from the University of Pittsburgh, Pennsylvania, US, in 1966.

== Career ==
Prior to enrolling for his Ph.D., Guobadia began his career as a physics teacher at Osogbo Grammar School (1957); Ilesha Grammar School (1958); Government College Ughelli (1958–1959); Edo College, Benin City (1960); Government College Ibadan (1960–1961) and the University of Nigeria, Nsukka (1961–1962). From 1966 - 1971, Guobadia was a Senior Lecturer and Head of Department of Physics at the University of Lagos, Nigeria.

Guobadia worked at Nigeria's National Universities Commission throughout most of the 1970s and early 1980s and rose to the position of Director of Academic Planning and subsequently, Executive Secretary of the Commission. In 1983, Guobadia helped the University of Benin, Benin City establish a Consultancy Services Unit and became the pioneer Director of the Unit.

In January 1984, Guobadia was appointed Commissioner of Education for the defunct Bendel State of Nigeria under the military administration of Brigadier Jeremiah Useni. Later in 1986, the Colonel John Mark Inienger military administration appointed him the Bendel State Commissioner of Finance and Economic Planning.

In 1987, President Ibrahim Babangida appointed Guobadia as Nigeria's first resident Ambassador Extraordinary and Plenipotentiary to the Republic of Korea.

Upon retirement, Guobadia floated a private educational consulting firm, Advanced Educational Services Limited, that was responsible for developing academic programs for several universities in Nigeria. Guobadia and Professor T. M. Yesufu played an influential role in the establishment of the Igbinedion University, Okada in Edo State, Nigeria.

In 2000, the government of President Olusegun Obasanjo appointed Guobadia Nigeria's Chief Electoral Officer. Guobadia was confirmed as the Chairman of Nigeria's Independent National Electoral Commission by the Nigerian Senate in May 2000.

Guobada retired from this position in May 2005 becoming the first Chairman of the Electoral Commission since Nigeria's independence in 1960, to complete his tenure.

Guobadia has served as chairman and/or member of many boards, including that of the New Nigeria Bank, West African Examinations Council and the Standards Organization of Nigeria. He has served in several capacities on Governing Councils of several universities in Nigeria. Guobadia was former Pro-Chancellor and Chairman of Council of the Edo State University, Ekpoma. Guobadia was the President of the Science Teachers Association of Nigeria (STAN) from 1971 to 1976 and remains an honorary life fellow of STAN. He is a Special Member of the Senate of the University of Benin, Benin City.

In seeking to advance the development of his cosmopolitan Edo community in mid-western Nigeria, Guobadia worked as the secretary of the Benin Forum and chairman of the Edo Forum respectively from 1992 to 2000.

Guobadia served as chairman of the board of trustees of a prominent non-governmental organisation, Women's Health and Action Research Centre (WHARC) located in Benin City, Nigeria. Guobadia died on 4 February 2011, at the age of 78.
