= Judiciary of Abia State =

Branch of the Abia State Government

The Judiciary of Abia State is a branch of the Abia State Government that interprets and applies the laws of Abia State. It acts as a mechanism for dispute resolution and also ensure equal justice under law.

== Structure ==
The Judiciary consists of the High Court with 23 serving Judges, Customary Court of Appeal with 4 Judges, Magistrate's courts with 56 Magistrates and Customary courts all headed by Judges and Magistrates. The Chief Judge, appointed by the Governor sequel to approval by the House of Assembly is the head of the Judiciary.

== See also ==
- Abia State Government
