= Ohuhu people =

Ethnic subgroup in Nigeria

Ohuhu Umuhu-na-Okaiuga
Total population
- Nigeria 64,000 (1962)

Languages
- Igbo, Nigerian Standard English

Religion
- Christianity (majority Methodist), Omenala

Related ethnic groups
- Umuokpara, Obowo, Ngwa

The Ohuhu clan of Umuahia north in Abia State Nigeria of the Igbo people, also referred to as Ohonhaw, form a unique community of people in Umuahia, Abia state, Nigeria, consisting of several Autonomous Communities including Umukabia, Ohiya, Isingwu, Umule Eke-Okwuru, Ofeme, Afugiri, Nkwoegwu, Umuawa, Ekeoba, Oriendu, Nkwoachara, Umudiawa, Umungasi, Akpahia, Umuagu, Amaogwugwu, Umuhu-Okigha, Amaogwugwu called Eziama/ Amaudo in Ohuhu etc. Ohuhu was formerly known as Umuhu-la-Okaiuga, or better-known as Ohu-ahia-la-otu. Until 1949, the Umuopara clan used to be part of Ohuhu before they were carved out politically.

== Origin ==
There are several beliefs regarding the origin of Ohuhu people. One view is that the Ohuhu people did not migrate from anywhere. This view is supported by the fact that most communities in Ohuhu have their old or abandoned settlements, Okpuala, also located in Ohuhu. While this view sounds plausible, some villages in Ohuhu today can convincingly trace their old settlements to places outside Ohuhu, even though they have another Okpuala now located in Ohuhu. Umukabia, Umuawa, Umuagu, Umungasi and Umudiawa are a few examples in this category.

It has been suggested that at least sections of the Umuhu people of Ohuhu came from Isuikwuato and Awgu areas. Far more persuasive than the rest is the theory that Ohuhu people migrated from parts of the present Etiti Division. Put so tersely, this theory leaves out a number of variants. For instance, one tradition claims that the movement began from Orsu and touched Okiwudo and Akaokwa all in the Orlu area. It then came to Anara-Osu. The tradition states that, while the Ohuhu ancestors lingered, Obowo ancestors in the horde continued their movement and settled at their present location before Ohuhu people joined them.

Another version maintained that the Ohuhu people, with their Obowo counterparts, migrated from the Nekede area in Owerri. In connection with this theory, some writers believe that traditionally, the ancestors of Ohuhu-Ngwa formed part of a migration from the Agbaja area in Owerri and moved to the Imo River. Whether the migration began in Orlu, Nekede, Agba or Ahiara, all three centers are situated on the same unbroken stretch of land.

A recurrent name in these theories is Obowo – a clan occupying the area west of the Imo River. This river, lying between the Obowo and Ohuhu clans, is to both an important landmark. Whether the Ohuhu people migrated from Orlu area or Owerri they must, of necessity, have crossed the Obowo territory before arriving at their present settlement. This area could well have been a resting point of a protracted journey to a promised land.

Possible kinship between Ohuhu and Obowo is suggested in the fact that many places and village names in either of the clans have their exact counterparts in the other. The two broad divisions of Ikenga and Ihite, for example, exist in both. Umukabi and Umuagu villages are known to have, in recent times, common festivals with their Obowo counterparts to commemorate their kinship.

Umuawa people in Ohuhu likewise are said to have migrated from Umuoparaodu and Umudibi in Obowo, where traces of their settlements could still be identified today.

What appears to be the strongest argument in favor of Ohuhu-Obowo kinship is their common possession of a peculiar deity – Ajana, which stood supreme in both clans and belonged exclusively to both.

== Villages ==
=== Afugiri ===
The eleven villages of Afugiri are as follows:

- Umuokoroala Okpuala
- Umuagungolori Okpuala
- Umuekwule Okpuala
- Umuchukwu
- Umunlewe
- Umuoshi
- Umuagungolori Obiohuru
- Umuosu
- Umunemeze
- Umuokoroala Obiohuru
- Umuakam

Umukoroala Okpuala and Umuagungolori Okpuala make up Umuegwu Okpuala community, while Umuekwule Okpuala, Umuchukwu, Umunlewe, and Umuoshi make up the Umuekwule Community. Umuagungolori Obiohuru, Umuosu, and Umuokoroala Obiohuru are of Umuegwu extraction.

The villages are in three Autonomous Communities:

- Egwu Ukwu Afugiri Autonomous Community, comprising Umuokoroala Okpuala, Umuagungolori Okpuala, and Umuagungolori Obiohuru
- Nkwoegwu Autonomous Community, comprising Umuakam, Umuoshi, Umunlewe, Umuchukwu and Umuekwule Okpuala
- Umuegwu Obiohuru Afugiri Autonomous Community, comprising Umuosu, Umunemeze and Umuokoroala Obiohuru.

=== Umule Ekeokwuru ===
Have seven villages which are as follows:

- Umusagba Okpuala
- Umuamadi
- Umuchelawo
- Umuocham
- Umuhere
- Umunso Okpuala
- Umunso Obiohuru
- And they are all under one Autonomous Community which is Okaiuga Alike Ancient Kingdom Autonomous Community.

=== Nkwoachara ===
Has five villages which are as follows:

- Umuire
- Umunkaru
- Amauhie
- Umuaram
- Umuyota

=== OHUHU ===
The 27 Autonomous Communities in Ohuhu, are as follows, along with the names of their Ezes:

In the Umuhu section:

- Ohiya- Eze A E Uhuegbu
- Oriendu - Eze Philip Ajomiwe
- Ekeoba - Eze Iheanyi Nwokonna
- Umuhu - Late Eze Onyema iv
- Umuagu - Eze John Ezeoma
- Umudiawa - Eze Nnamdi Ofoegbu
- Mbato Ofeme - Eze Emeka Nwankwo
- Afukwu Ofeme - Eze Eze U I Iheanacho
- Ofeme - Eze E C O Udoka
- Isingwu - Eze D I Ukaegbu
- Okpu Isingwu - Eze Emekaobum.

In the Okaiuga section:

- Nkwoegwu Afugiri - HRH Eze (Sir) Chijioke James Chikwekwem UGA IV
- Egwu Ukwu Afugiri - Eze Onyebuchi Onuoha
- Umuegwu Obiohuru Afugiri - Eze C C Ngwuli
- Okaiuga Alike - Eze Innocent A. Nwaigwe - Ikeuga II
- Umukabia Okaiuga Alike - Eze Uzo Nwosu
- Okaiuga Nkwoegwu - Eze Paul Uzuegbu
- Umuosu Nkwoegwu - Eze J N Mbakwe
- Umuohuru Nkwoegwu - Eze Bobby Aguocha
- Egwu Na Eleke - Eze B U Akabuike
- Umuawa Alaocha I- Eze G Asomugha
- Umuawa Alaocha II - Late Eze A G U Ohaeri
- Umuyota Umuawa - Late Eze N Nwakanma
- Nkwoachara - Eze Okechukwu Nwaubani (Eze-elect)
- Ikenga - Eze V A Onuoha
- Akpahia - Eze C U Emezuo
