= Chief Judge of Abia State =

- Incumbent; Justice Lilian Abai since 5 May 2023
- Judiciary of Abia State
- Abbreviation: CJ
- Seat: High Court of Justice, Abia State
- Appointer: Governor of Abia State
- Constituting instrument: Constitution of 1999 (Section 271)
- Final holder: Justice Onuoha A.K Ogwe

The Chief Judge of Abia State is the title or office appointed to the head of the judiciary of the Abia State Government. The Chief Judge is appointed by the Governor of Abia State to preside over the state's High Court and also to oversee and supervise its unified court system. The incumbent Chief Judge is Justice Lilian Abai, who was appointed into the position by Alex Otti in May 2023.

== Appointment ==
The Chief Judge is appointed by the Governor on the recommendation of the National Judicial Council subject to confirmation of the appointment by the Abia State House of Assembly as required by Section 271 of the 1999 Constitution of Nigeria.

== List of Chief Judges ==
- Ijeoma Offonry
- Nnenna Oti (Acting)
- Shedrack Nwanosike (Acting)
- Stella Nwakanma
- Theresa Uzokwe

== See also ==
- Abia State Government
- Attorney General of Abia State
