= Theresa Uzokwe =

Nigerian legal practitioner

Chief Judge of Abia State
- Incumbent
- Assumed office 22 December 2014
- Appointed by: Theodore Orji
- Preceded by: Stella Nwakanma

Personal details
- Born: Theresa Uzoamaka Uzokwe Anambra State, Nigeria
- Profession: Lawyer

Theresa Uzoamaka Uzokwe // is a Nigerian legal practitioner. She is the current Chief Judge of Abia State after she was appointed on 22 December 2014 by Theodore Orji. Prior to her appointment, she had served twice in the position as acting Chief Judge.

== See also ==
- Chief Judge of Abia State
