= Umukabia =

Umukabia Autonomous Community Ojim Ukwu Nnu Egbe
- Location in Nigeria
- Coordinates: 5°36′N 7°32′E
- Country: Nigeria
- State: Abia State
- Town: Umuahia
- Local Government Area: Umuahia North
- Community: Ohuhu

Government
  - Eze: HRM Eze Sir (Dr.) Uzo Nwosu

Population
  - Ethnicities: Igbo
  - Religions: Christianity Omenala

Umukabia [Ojim Ukwu Nnu Egbe] (Igbo for Ukabia's children) is a village in the Ohuhu community of Umuahia North Local Government Area, Abia State, Nigeria. There are also several other villages in Nigeria with the same name. Umukabia comprises 3 small villages namely; Okpuala being the eldest, followed by Umuagbom and Azummiri. Within these 3 small villages are 6 compounds-For Okpuala, they comprise-Agbom Na Omurumba and Umu Eze Aguma. Azumiri is regarded as a single compound. In the case of Umuagbom, there are three compounds, namely, Umuezeocha, Ibeneze also Uhu Ukwu Na Ezegiri and Ukwu Udara. Noteworthy is that each of these compounds finds further sub-divisions, comprising family units, each headed by a patriarch, usually the oldest male member of that family unit. This oldest male is also regarded as the ultimate repository of the knowledge, cultures and traditions of the family unit and sometimes Umukabia as a whole. He performs all the rituals and ceremonies regarding the compound and seeks reciprocals with the ancestors through oracles and ritualizations. These elders or patriarchs constitute Umukabia's democratic dispensation and policy making unit, in that they collectively make and take decisions on behalf of the entire Umukabia community. Whatever decisions they make is binding across the village and even beyond to Diasporic sons and daughters of Umukabia (Ogbuagu, 2013). Umukabia's renowned market day is known as Orie Umukabia Orie. Umukabia has a major river known as Ikwu, which traverses the villages in Umuire, Umuegwu Okpula Former Eastern Nigeria Premier, Dr. Michael Iheonukara Okpara's village and flows into the famous Imo River basin Imo/Abia States, Nigeria.Legend has it that Umukabia sits on a large rock which has made it impossible for bore holes to be successfully dug in any part of the village for the purposes of extracting water. The village holds annual ceremonies known as Iri Ji (new yam) festival and Ekpe festival which is termed as the village Christmas and holds on an Orie market day after Christmas but never on a Sunday.

== History ==
=== Origin ===
Umukabia's founding father and patriarch, was a man named Ukabia (sic. 18th Century), who is thought to have migrated from the neighboring Imo state. It is possible, as the names allude that he has also founded other Umukabia villages around Igboland and these villages have known to have visited each other. Most families in Umukabia are a descendant of the apical ancestor, Ukabia; others may have migrated into the area.

==== Ukabia ====
Ukabia Uga is the founding father and patriarch of Umukabia and may have lived sometime between the 16th and 17th century. Umukabia's ancestral deity is Alumeze, which is the blood union of all of Ukabia's descendants.

== Culture ==
Umukabia's main appellation is Ojim Ukwu Nnu Egbe, contingent on the ability of Umukabia black smiths of the days of yore to produce 400 musket guns in short order. With this ability, Ukabia warriors were able to parry and route any aggression by neighboring villages, who dared to challenge her.

Umukabia is known for its culture and tradition including music and dance among which are Brass Band, Kokoma-I stand by, Igborokiti, Onye oria agba, Odumodu and others. Indeed, a lot of fecund spinsters who attended ceremonies in Umukabia were said to have refused to return to their homes of origin and subsequently eloped with young men in the village. Recently in the 1990s some bold youth challenged the community's resolve not to have or participate in any abrasive behaviors, by introducing a brand of masquerade, "Ekpe" which is common in Nkwoegwu and Umuopara. The elders fought relentlessly, albeit unsuccessfully to suppress this new culture, which they considered abrasive, aggressive and largely uncouth, due to the behaviors and appearance of its connoisseurs [rubbing of charcoal mixed with oil and carrying whips with which they routed spectators], who are frequently inebriated during the event. In all the other traditional dances, on the contrary, participants are elegantly and luxuriously dressed, while they carry themselves with much dignity and respect. Currently, some sections of Umukabia perform the "Ekpe" dance while others continue to resist it. Since the 2023 "Iri Egwu" [Christmas] Umukabia, the "Ekpe" dance appears to have gained a paramount status, including universal approval and acclaim, far and above any other traditional dance in Umukabia. To show how corrosive the "Ekpe" dance has become, the most popular festive dance in Umuagbom, one of the villages in Umukabia, "Igborokiti" appears to have even been rendered obsolete and no longer features during festivities.

=== Marriage ===
Although Umukabia as an autonomous community is quite populous, it is an exogamous community, which means that marriages and any romance occur outside the village apart from kindred villages like Nkata Alike. Sometime in the past, a ritual referred to as "Isu Ogwu" was performed to initiate endogamy [marriage within the village or intermarriage]. However, no one has as yet dared to challenge the taboo of endogamy.

Funerals and Burial Rituals

Funeral and rituals that pertain to them date back to the culture and traditions that bind Umukabia with other villages in Ohuhu. Prior to the use of morgues and the refrigeration system for preservation most funerals occurred within forty-eight hours following the passage. Currently, most funerals are elaborate and sometimes quite expensive and can run into hundreds of thousand of Naira or thousands of dollars (Ogbuagu, 2011). There are four major market days in Ohuhu, namely, Eke, Nkwo, Orie and Afor. Passages that occur on Eke market days and not announced, because dying on an Eke market day is viewed as abomination. To this extent, passages on Eke market days are not announced until the following day. This has led to the common proverb-"A gam amugbu onwu Eke n'anya"-meaning, I shall refuse to die on Eke market, no matter what death decrees. Most funerals and interment are in the deceased compound as Umukabia has no community cemetery. Death attracts common grief as every Umukabia citizen is related by a common ancestry, Ukabia, and by a common deity called "Alumeze." In this regard, the whole community joins in the mourning and funeral arrangement and will remain with the family of the deceased for quite a while. In-laws, and friends from outside of Umukabia are also involved in these funeral rites (Ogbuagu, 2011). Traditionally, no death is without a cause. In this regard and as has been the custom, the oracles are consulted to inquire into the origins of this death. If the deceased was not a "good citizen" often the family is left to deal with the funeral on its own and no family wants this. In the days gone by, if the deceased was determined not to be a good person, or had committed abominable acts while alive, they were thrown into the "evil forest." Currently, Christianity has whittled most of this culture away. Consistent with how most cultures view death of young persons, the death of a child is particularly painful and it goes against the cultural norm for a parent to bury their child rather than vice versa. In Umukabia of yore and even today to a large extent, most parents are forbidden to see the face of their dead child, especially if the deceased is a young adult. In that case, the only duty of the surviving parent would be to point out a burial site and the child is interred there, without fanfare and with much grief as this death indicated an effervescence of normal and linear expectations of development within the family and human cycle (Ogbuagu, 2011).

== Geography ==
Umukabia is in the Umuahia North Local Government Area and is neighbored by the villages of Umule at the north and Nkatalike to the south.

== See also ==
- Umuahia
- Abia state
- Ohuhu
- Igbo people
