= Ohafia War Dance =

War dance performed in some parts of Eastern Nigeria

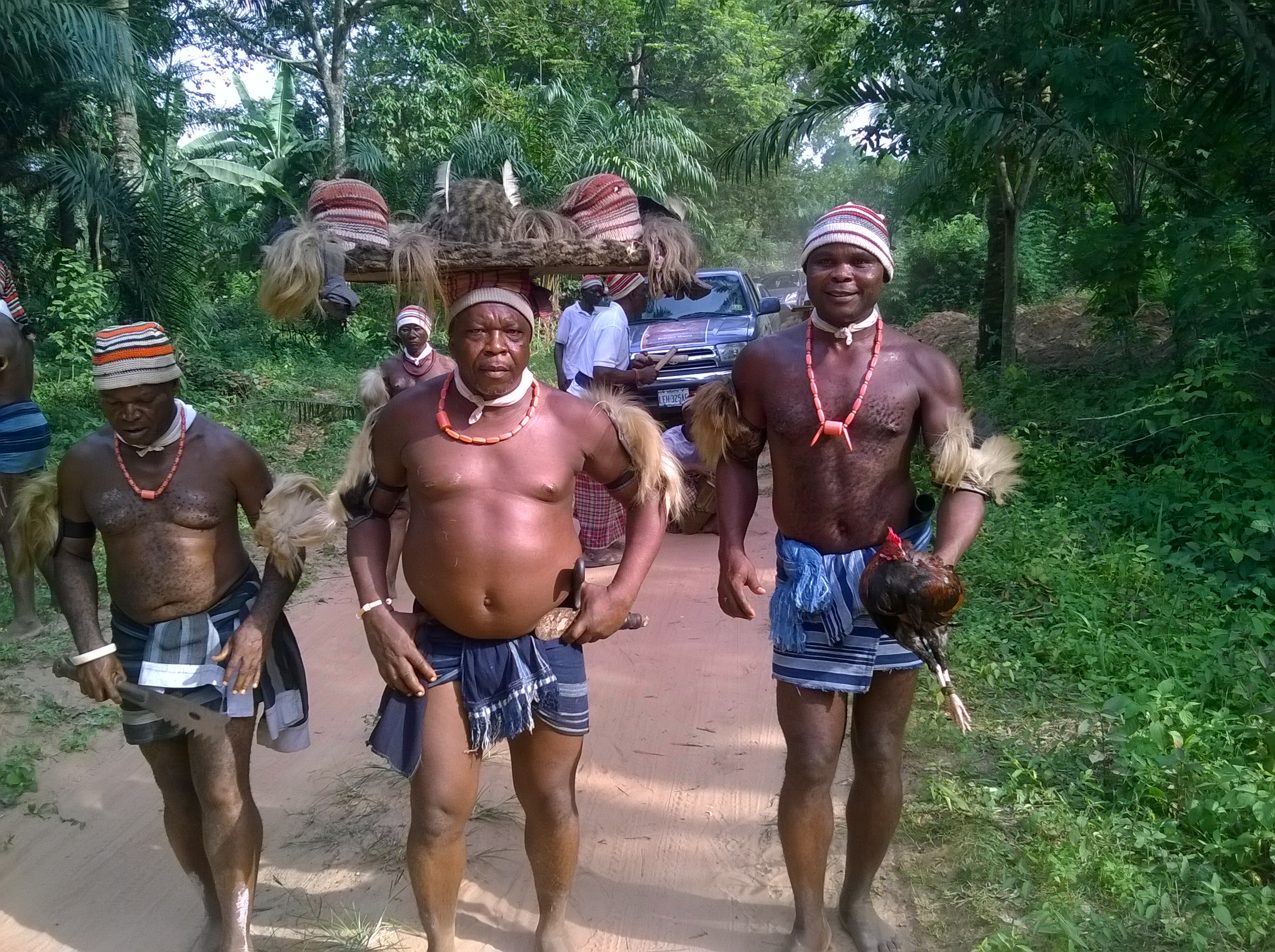
Ohafia War Dance entertainers at a burial ceremony in Enugu.

The Ohafia War Dance // (Igbo: ikpirikpi ogu) is a popular war dance performed in several parts of Eastern Nigeria. The dance which has its roots from Ohafia is performed by a group of muscular men in commemoration of their strength in fighting and winning wars in the past.

== Origin ==
According to oral history, the ancestors of Ohafia were renowned to be mighty men of war who were always on the lookout for wars to take part in. The Ohafia warrior tradition which remains one of the fundamental identity of the people of Ohafia is hinged in the performance of ikpirikpi ogu - the practice of beheading a fallen enemy. A human skull is a proof of a man's courage and strength. Only those who brought home a human head could join the Ogbu-Isi society and wear an eagle's plume which is a symbol of courage.

== Performance ==
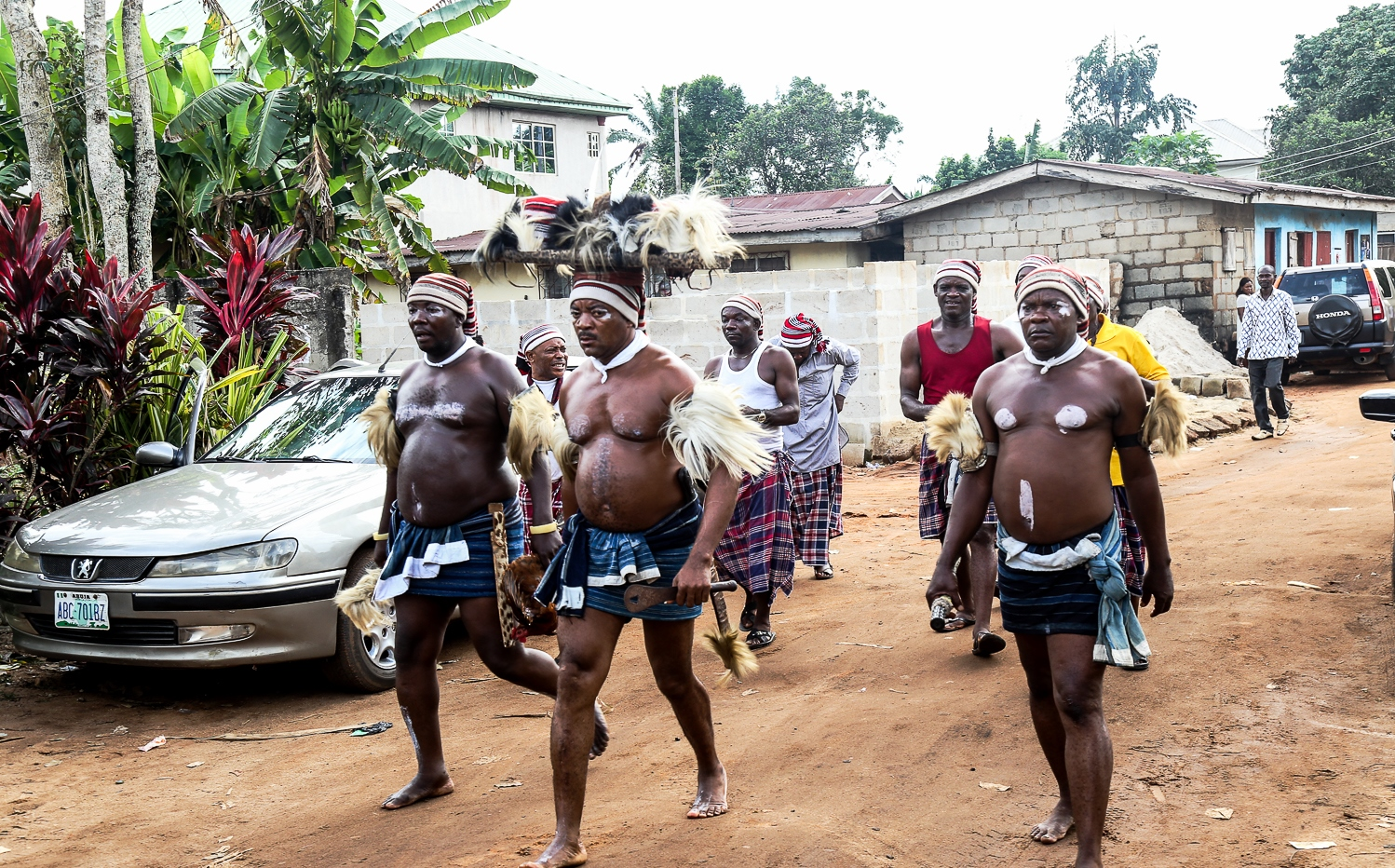
An Ohafia War Dance group headed by a leader

The Ohafia War Dance which is also performed to celebrate an individual's achievement is headed by a lead dancer carrying a basket full of human skulls (Igbo: oyaya) while holding a short cutlass and a small palm shoot in his mouth, while his fellow dancers dressed like fierce warriors mime the cutting off of human head while dancing to the music from the akwatankwa musical instrument thus portraying Ohafia as a land of brave warriors.
