= Azubuike Onyebuchi =

Nigerian professor of obstetrics and gynecology

Azubuike Kanario Onyebuchi is a Nigerian professor of obstetrics and gynecology. He is currently the Chief Medical Director of Federal Medical Centre, Umuahia.

== Education and career ==
Prof Azubuike holds a Bachelor of Medicine, Bachelor of Surgery (MBBS) degree of the University of Nigeria, a master's degree in Health Administration, Economics and Policy, also of the University of Nigeria.

Azubuike Onyebuchi is a Fellow of the West African College of Surgeons, Assistant secretary general of the Society of Obstetrics and Gynaecology of Nigeria and a member of the body of examiners of the West African College of Surgeons, Faculty of obstetrics and gynaecology. In April 2021, he was promoted to the rank of Professor of obstetrics and gynaecology at the Alex Ekwueme Federal University Ndufu-Alike, Ebonyi State. Until his appointment as CMD, he served as the chairman, Medical Advisory Committee at the Alex Ekwueme Federal Teaching Hospital, Abakaliki.
