= Federal Medical Centre, Umuahia =

Federal Medical Centre in Nigeria

Geography
- Location: Umuahia, Abia State, Nigeria

Links
- Lists: Hospitals in Nigeria

Federal Medical Centre, Umuahia is a federal government of Nigeria medical centre located in Umuahia, Abia State, Nigeria. The current chief medical director is Azubuike Onyebuchi.

== History ==
Federal Medical Centre, Umuahia was established in 1945. The hospital was formerly known as Queen Elizabeth Specialist Hospital, Umuahia and was renamed to Federal Medical Centre, Umuahia in November 1991.
