= Chedli =

Chedli is both a given name and a surname. Notable people with the name include:

- Adel Chedli (born 1976), Tunisian footballer
- Chedli Klibi (1925–2020), Tunisian politician and former secretary general of the Arab League

== See also ==
- Stade Chedli Zouiten
- CHED (disambiguation)
