= Amarachi Okafor =

Nigerian artist

- Born: 1977 (age 48–49); Umuahia
- Education: University of Nigeria
- Awards: Unesco-Aschberg artists’ residency, finalist in the 2014 National Art Competition

Amarachi Okafor// (born 1977) is a Nigerian artist whose works have focused on culture, religion, history, gender relations, human sexuality, and topical issues, like the spread of the Ebola virus in Africa.

== Early life and education ==
Okafor was born in Umuahia. In 2002 she attended a fine arts course at the University of Nigeria and in 2007, at the same university, held a master's degree in sculpture and curatorial practice.

== Career ==
Okafor was a member of El Anatsui's atelier in the late 1990s.

Okafor works in painting and sculpture. She was the curator at NGA (National Gallery of Art) in Abuja between 2008 and 2014. In 2007 she won a Unesco-Aschberg artists' residency, and the Commonwealth Foundation Commonwealth Connections in 2010. In 2014, she was a finalist in the 2014 National Art Competition, and won the Juror's prize that year.

She exhibited at the 2015 Jogja Biennale.

Okafor's "The Colour of My Heart Is Colour of My City" was a touring (2015-2019) solo art exhibition that exhibited at the Centre for Contemporary Art, Lagos.
