= Ched (given name) =

Ched is a given name. Notable people with the name include:

- Ched Evans (born 1988), Welsh footballer
- Ched Myers, American theologian
- Ched Towns (1951–2000), Australian adventurer
