= CHED =

CHED may refer to:

- CHED (AM), a radio station (880 AM) licensed to Edmonton, Alberta, Canada
- Commission on Higher Education (CHED), a government agency in the Philippines

== See also ==
- Ched (name)
