= Russell Short =

Australian Paralympic athlete

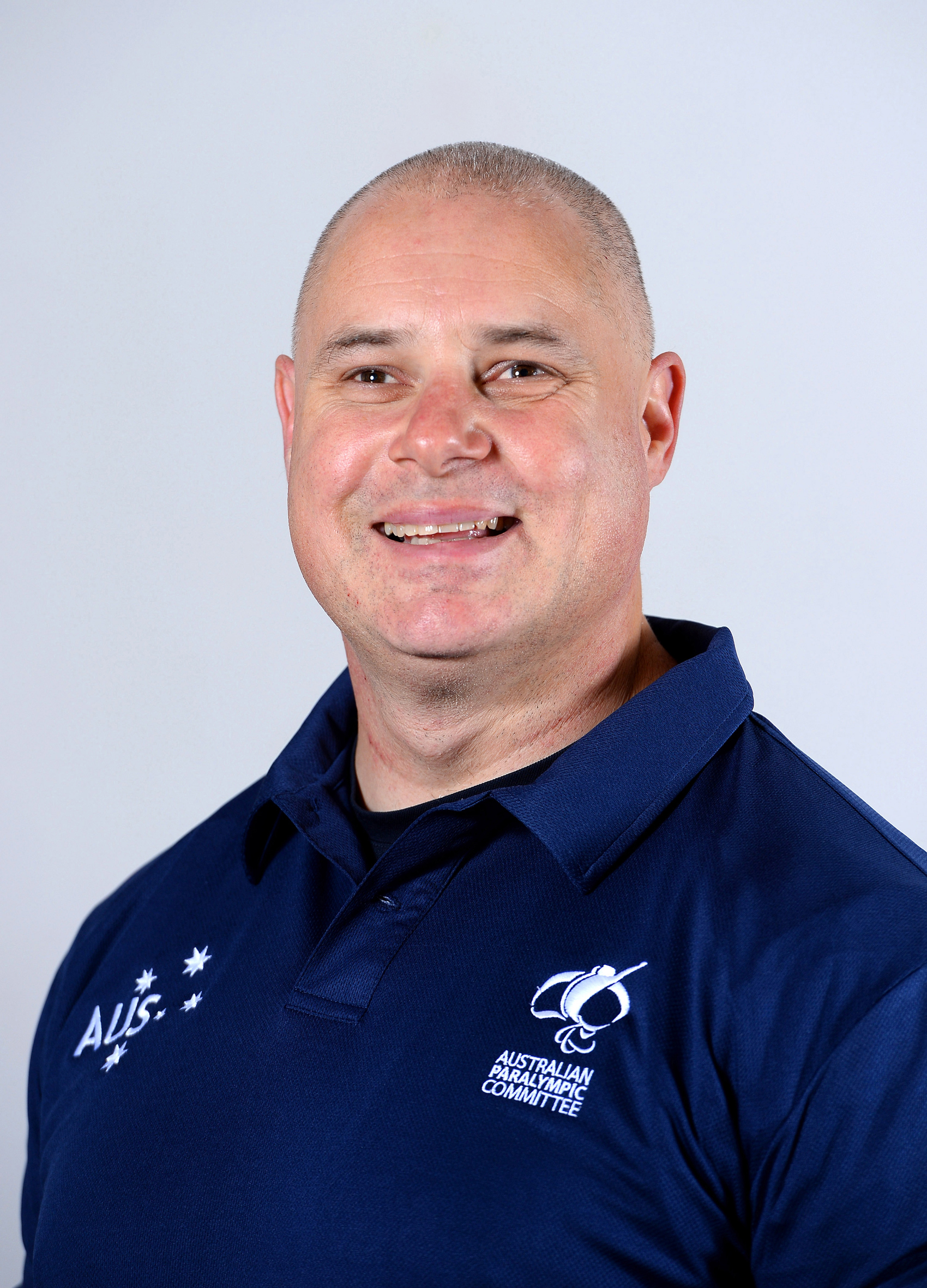
- 2016 Australian Paralympic team portrait of Short

Personal information
- Full name: Russell Luke Short
- Nationality: Australian
- Born: 7 May 1969 (age 57) Poowong, Victoria
- Height: 185 cm (6 ft 1 in)
Medal record
Athletics
Paralympic Games
Gold medal – first place	1988 Seoul	Men's Discus B3
Gold medal – first place	1988 Seoul	Men's Javelin B3
Gold medal – first place	1992 Barcelona	Men's Discus B3
Gold medal – first place	1992 Barcelona	Men's Shot Put B3
Gold medal – first place	2000 Sydney	Men's Shot Put F12
Gold medal – first place	2000 Sydney	Men's Discus Throw F12
Silver medal – second place	1996 Atlanta	Men's Discus F12
Silver medal – second place	1996 Atlanta	Men's Shot Put F12
Bronze medal – third place	1988 Seoul	Men's Shot Put B3
Bronze medal – third place	1992 Barcelona	Men's Javelin B3
Bronze medal – third place	2004 Athens	Men's Shot Put F13
Bronze medal – third place	2012 London	Men's Shot Put F11/12
IPC Athletics World Championships
Gold medal – first place	1994 Berlin	Men's Shot Put F12
Gold medal – first place	1994 Berlin	Men's Discus F12
Silver medal – second place	1998 Birmingham	Men's Discus F12
Silver medal – second place	2002 Lille	Men's Discus F12
Silver medal – second place	2006 Assen	Men's Shot Put F12
Silver medal – second place	2011 Christchurch	Men's Shot Put F12
World Championships and Games for the Disabled
Gold medal – first place	1990 Assen	Men's Shot Put B3
Gold medal – first place	1990 Assen	Men's Discus B3

Russell Luke Short, OAM (born 7 May 1969) is an Australian legally blind athlete, who has competed at eight Paralympics from 1988 to 2016 and won six gold, two silver and four bronze medals at the Games. He competes in discus, javelin, and shot put.

== Personal ==
Russell Luke Short was born on 7 May 1969 in the Victorian town of Poowong. He has 2% peripheral vision due to macular degeneration, which first began to affect him at the age of four and a half; his brother also has the disease. He attended Korumburra Secondary College. He played many sports in high school, including swimming, diving, and basketball, but he could no longer participate in these sports as his sight gradually became more impaired. He took up discus and shot put because he found he enjoyed throwing things.

In 1993, he kayaked across the Torres Strait from Cape York to New Guinea as part of a team of four men including Paralympian Ched Towns, and also walked the Kokoda Track with them. These experiences were recounted in the 1995 documentary The Blind Leading The Blind and the 2004 book Blind leading the blind : a journey of vision across the Torres Strait and Kokoda track.

He lives in the Melbourne suburb of Glen Huntly with his wife, Christine, who is also legally blind, and two sons, Jim and Will. He works as a massage therapist.

== Career ==
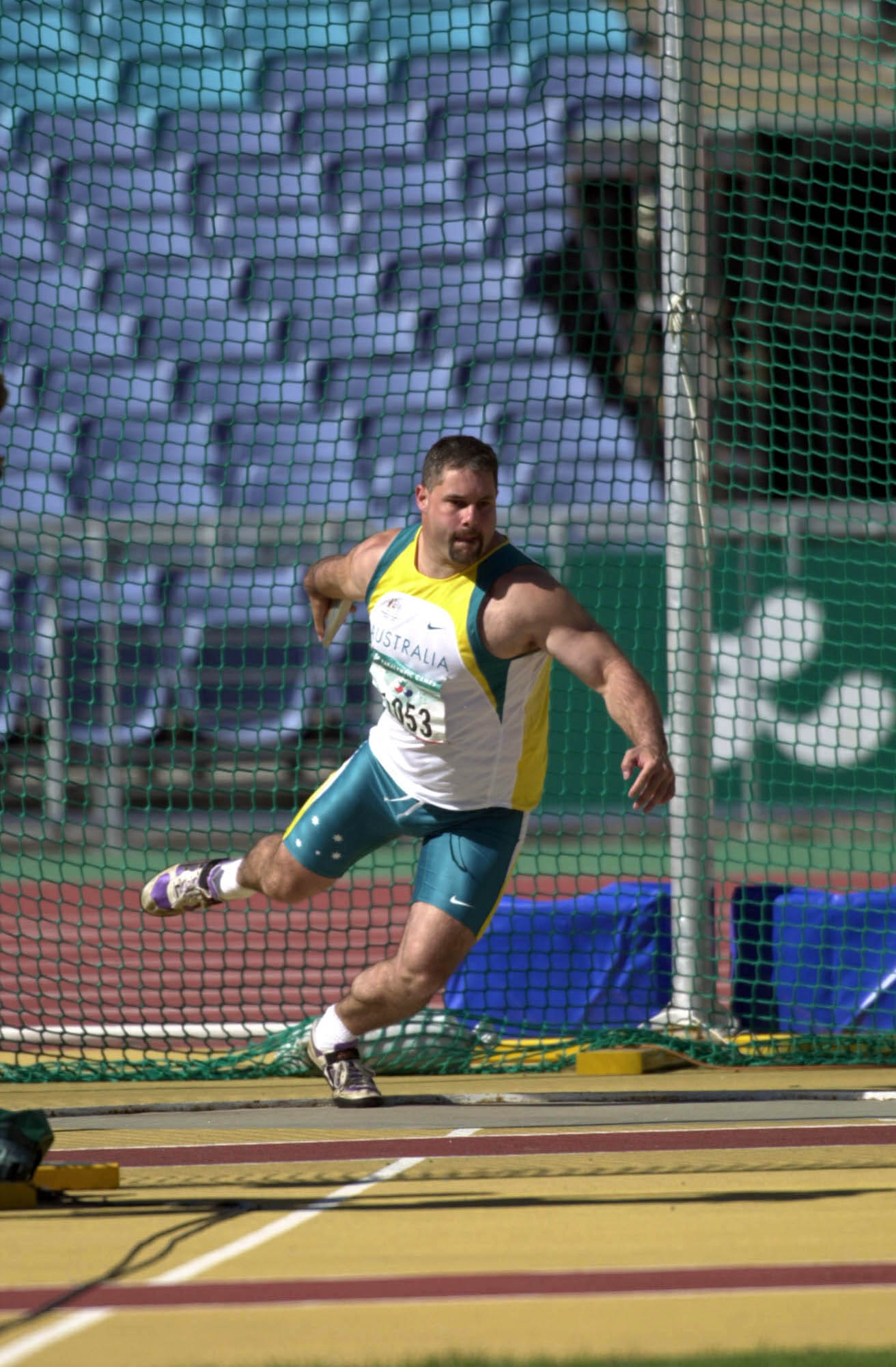
Short throwing the discus during discus F12 competition at the 2000 Summer Paralympics. Short won gold in this event.

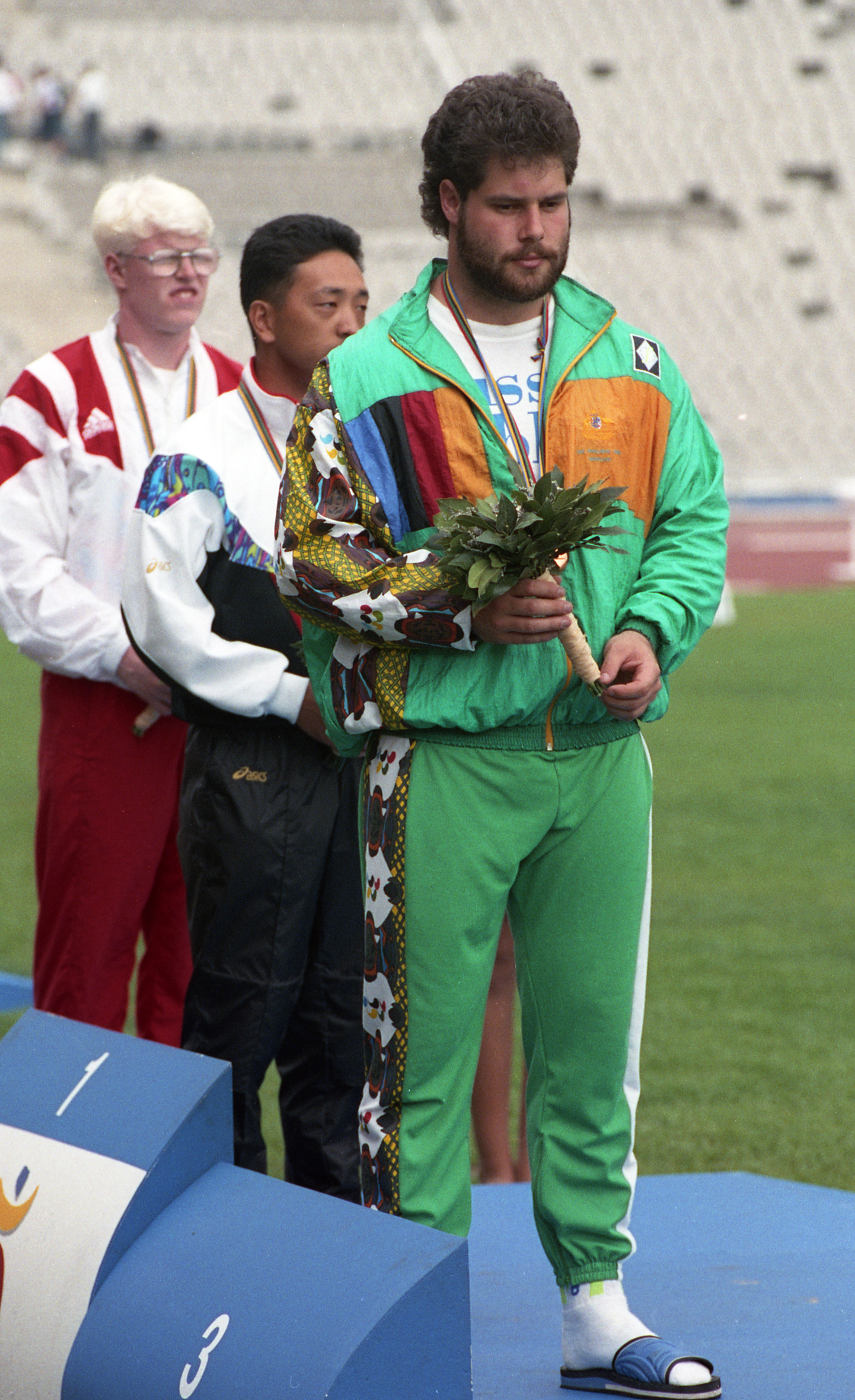
Short on the medal podium at the 1992 Barcelona Paralympics

Short began his competitive career in 1982. His first Paralympic Games were the 1988 Seoul Paralympics, where he won two gold medals in the Men's Discus B3 and Men's Javelin B3 events, and a bronze medal in the Men's Shot Put B3 event.

In 1988, he became the first disabled person to receive a scholarship from the Australian Institute of Sport (AIS). In 1990, while being coached by AIS Throws Coach Merv Kemp, he broke the discus B2 world record twice. He competed in the 1990 World Championships and Games for the Disabled, Assen, Netherlands winning gold medals in the Men's Shot Put and Discus B3 events.

In the 1992 Barcelona Games, he won two gold medals in the Men's Discus B3 and Men's Shot Put B3 events, for which he received a Medal of the Order of Australia, and a bronze medal in the Men's Javelin B3 event.

In the 1996 Atlanta Games, he won two silver medals in the Men's Discus F12 and Men's Shot Put F12 events. He won two gold medals at the 2000 Sydney Games, setting a world record in the Men's Discus Throw F12 event and a Paralympic Games record in the Men's Shot Put F12 event. In the 2004 Athens Games, he won a bronze medal in the Men's Shot Put F13 event and came fifth in the Men's Discus F12 event. Six weeks before winning the bronze medal, he had fallen off a two-meter wall and broken his arm.

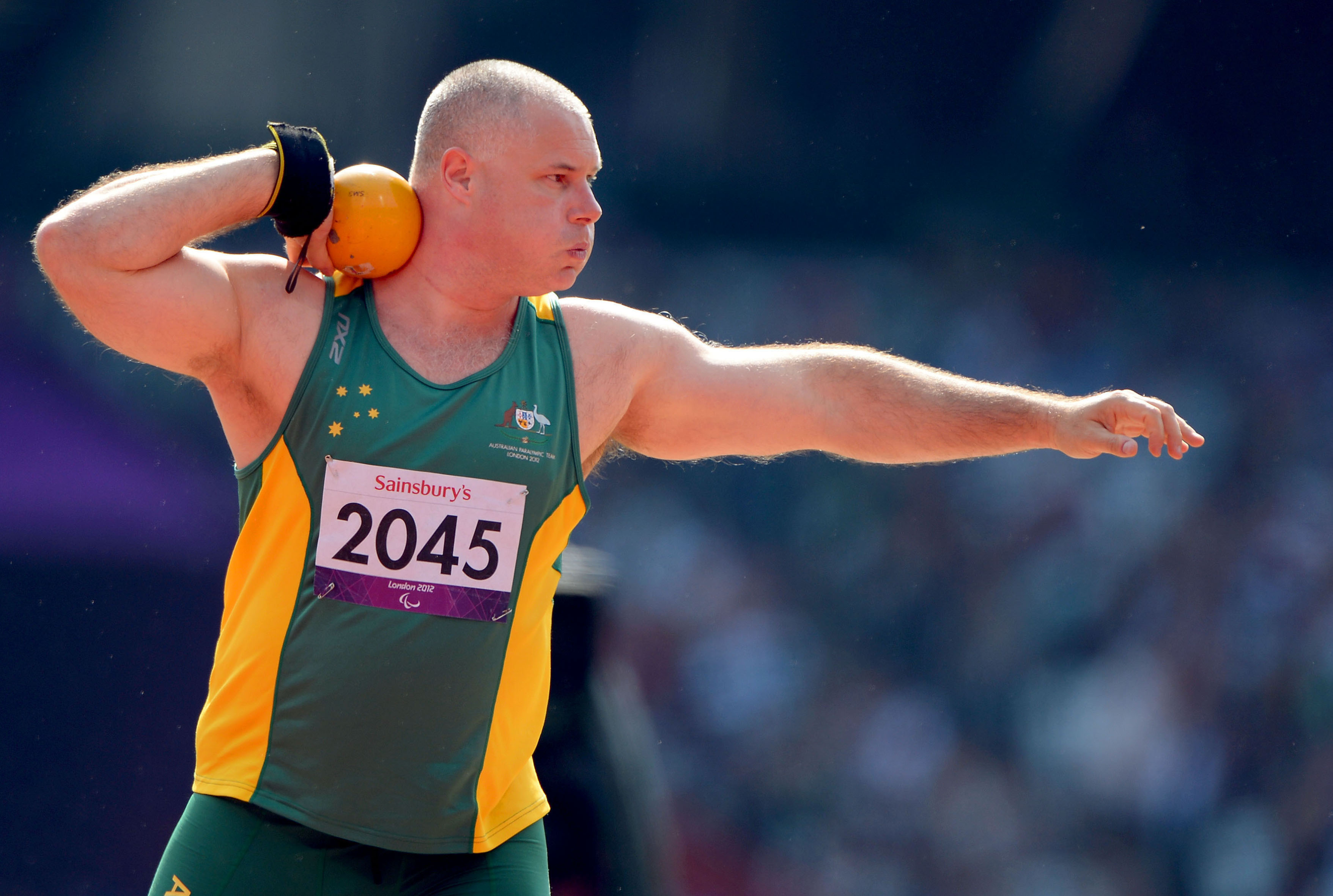
Short at the 2012 London Paralympics

Short carried the Australian flag during the opening ceremony of the 2008 Beijing Games. At the Games, he came sixth in the Men's Shot Put F11/12 event. He won a silver medal in the Discus event at the 2011 IPC Athletics World Championships in Christchurch, New Zealand. In a February 2011 interview shortly after the Championships, he said: "Things are starting to fall apart, particularly my shoulder, but with a lot of changes to the way I train and a lot of physio, I'm confident I'll be right".

At the 2012 London Paralympics, Short won a bronze medal in the Men's Shot Put F11/12 event. At the 2016 Rio Paralympics, he finished seventh in the Men's Shot Put F12.

In April 2017, Short was awarded the Athletics Australia Edwin Flack Award for 2016.

At the 2017 World Para Athletics Championships in London, England, his eight championship, he finished fifth in the Men's Shot Put F12 with a throw of 14.29 m and seventh in the Men's Discus F12 with a throw of 39.31 m.
