= Ezeleke =

- Village
- Ezeleke
- Location in Nigeria
- Coordinates: 5°32′28.3″N 7°26′36.8″E
- Country: Nigeria
- State: Abia

Ezeleke is a village, also known as umunne asaa (a village which is organized around patrilineage) and located in Abia state, Nigeria. The village leader, titled President General of the Ezeleke community is Gideon Nwosu.
