= Attorney General of Abia State =

- Incumbent; Ikechukwu Uwanna since 2023
- Style: The Honorable
- Term length: No term limits
- Formation: Constitution of Nigeria

The Attorney General of Abia State is the Chief Legal and Law Enforcement Officer of Abia State. It is the executive branch of government that has its official appointed by the Governor with the approval of the Abia State House of Assembly.

The Attorney General who jointly serves as the Commissioner of Justice is responsible for the supervising and defending of the law and constitution of Abia State.

== Office of the Attorney General ==
The office of the Attorney General is described in Chapter VI, section 195 of the1999 Constitution of the Federal Republic of Nigeria (as amended) as follows:

(1)There shall be an Attorney-General for each State who shall be the Chief Law Officer of the State and Commissioner for Justice of the Government of that State. (2) A person shall not be qualified to hold or perform the functions of the office of the Attorney-General of a State unless he is qualified to practise as a legal practitioner in Nigeria and has been so qualified for not less than ten years.

== Functions of the Attorney General ==
Section 211 of the Constitution provides that "the Attorney General shall have power":

1. To institute and undertake criminal proceedings against any person before any court of law in Nigeria other than a court-martial in respect of any offence created by or under any law of the House of Assembly;
2. To take over and continue any such criminal proceedings that may have been instituted by any other authority or person; and
3. To discontinue at any stage before judgement is delivered any such criminal proceedings instituted or undertaken by him or any other authority or person.

In addition to the functions of the Attorney General provided under Section 211 of the Constitution, the Attorney-General shall be responsible for:

1. advising Government Ministries, Departments, Constitutional Commissions and State Corporations on legislative and other legal matters;
2. advising the Government on all matters relating to the Constitution, international law, human rights, consumer protection and legal aid;
3. negotiating, drafting, vetting and interpreting local and international documents, agreements and treaties for and on behalf of the Government and its agencies;
4. coordinating reporting obligations to international human rights treaty bodies to which Nigeria is a member on any matter which Abia State is required to report;
5. drafting legislation for the Government and advising the Government and its agencies on legal matters;
6. constantly reviewing the laws of Abia State in consonance with the global best practices and dynamism of the legal profession;
7. oversees all legal matters pertaining to the administration of estates and trusts;
8. representing the Government in all criminal and civil matters; and
9. performing any function as may be necessary for the effective discharge of the duties and the exercise of the powers of the Attorney-General.

== Powers of the Attorney General ==
Source: Abia State Ministry of Justice

The Attorney General shall, by virtue of his Office, have the exclusive right to:

1. sit in the inner bar or when no facilities exist for an inner bar, on the front row of seats available for Legal Practitioners and also mention any motion in which he is appearing or any other cause or matter, out of its turn on the cause list in accordance to the Legal Practitioners Act;
2. appear at any stage of any proceedings, appeal, execution or any incidental proceedings before any court or tribunal in which by law the Attorney General's right of audience is not excluded;
3. require any officer in the public service to furnish any information in relation to any matter which is the subject of legal inquiry;
4. summon any officer in the public service to explain any matter which is the subject of litigation by or against the Government;
5. issue directions to any officer performing legal functions in any Government Ministry;
6. establish such Departments, sections or units in the Office as may be necessary;
7. supervise the formulation of policies and plans of the Office;
8. perform any other action necessary in the administrative interests of the Office;
9. appear and advise on any legal matter in any committee.

== Departments in the Office of the Attorney General ==
Source: Abia State Ministry of Justice

The following departments are created in the office of the Attorney General for the smooth running of the office and effective service delivery to the public:

1. Department of Civil Litigation;
2. Department of Public Prosecution;
3. Department of Estate and Trust
4. Department of Legal Drafting;
5. Department of Citizens’ Rights;
6. Department of Mediation;
7. Department of Corporate and Commercial Law;
8. Department of Advisory Services;
9. Department of Training;
10. Department of Strategic Planning, Research and Publication;
11. Department of Finance and Account;
12. Department of Administration and Supplies;
13. Department of Planning and Statistics;

== History ==
The office was established in 1991 with the creation of Abia State to ensure justice, law and order in the state. Over the years, eleven officials have served in the capacity of Attorneys General and they have been pivotal in shaping the state's legal framework and maintaining the rule of law.

== List of Attorneys General ==
Source: Abia State Ministry of Justice

Chief Justice	Term
Chief Theo Nkire	1991 - 1992
Chief Cletus Akpulonu Kalunta	1992 - 1993
Chief Eze Onuoha	1993 - 1997
Ugochukwu Okeugo	1997 - 1998
Sam Azuara	1998 - 1999
Chief Awa U. Kalu, SAN	1999 - 2005
Chief Solo Akuma, SAN	2005 - 2007
Chief Okey Amaechi, SAN	2007 - 2009
Chief Umeh Kalu, SAN	2009 - 2019
Chief Uche Ihediwa, SAN	2019 - 2023
Ikechukwu Uwanna, SAN	2023–Present

== Achievements of the incumbent Attorney General ==
Since assuming office in 2023, the incumbent Attorney General, Ikechukwu Uwanna has initiated several key developments in Abia State's justice system:

1. Established ultra-modern solar-powered digital workstations at the Ministry of Justice offices in Umuahia and Aba to enhance law officers' efficiency;
2. Initiated a comprehensive digitization of legal processes and documents in the Ministry of Justice by creating a centralized digital storage system that enables instant document retrieval and proper indexing, thereby integrating technology to ensure effective administration of justice;
3. Initiated the construction of modern court halls across all 17 local government areas in Abia State, incorporating renewable energy systems, natural lighting features, and modern architectural design;
4. Developed and implemented new state laws focused on improving citizens' livelihood and enhancing the state's economic growth;
5. Provided state-of-the-art electronic recording devices and crucial legal resources including the Abia Law Journals and Quarterly Law Reports to the Abia State Police Command to enhance the investigative capacity of the Nigerian Police Force, expedite the wheels of justice and strengthen the state's criminal justice system;
6. Initiated the digitization of laws of Abia state to improve accessibility and reference for legal practitioners and the public.
