= Ogbodiukwu =

Ogbodi Ukwu
- Village
- Ogbodiukwu
- Location within Nigeria
- Coordinates: 5°32′29.4″N 7°26′24.2″E

Ogbodiukwu is a village, also known as umunne asaa (a village which is organized around patrilineage) and located in Abia state, Nigeria.

Ogbodiukwu hosts the annual synod of the Ebenezer Methodist Church. And has hosted the Ekpe festival on several occasions and every year. The village is led by the community chiefs and kinsmen. For legitimate confirmation Contact 'Chief Bathlomew Ogbonna who is the community representative. We need development in the community. The only problem the face is leadership which is important for the growth of any locality.
