= Chidi Kwubiri =

Nigerian-German visual artist

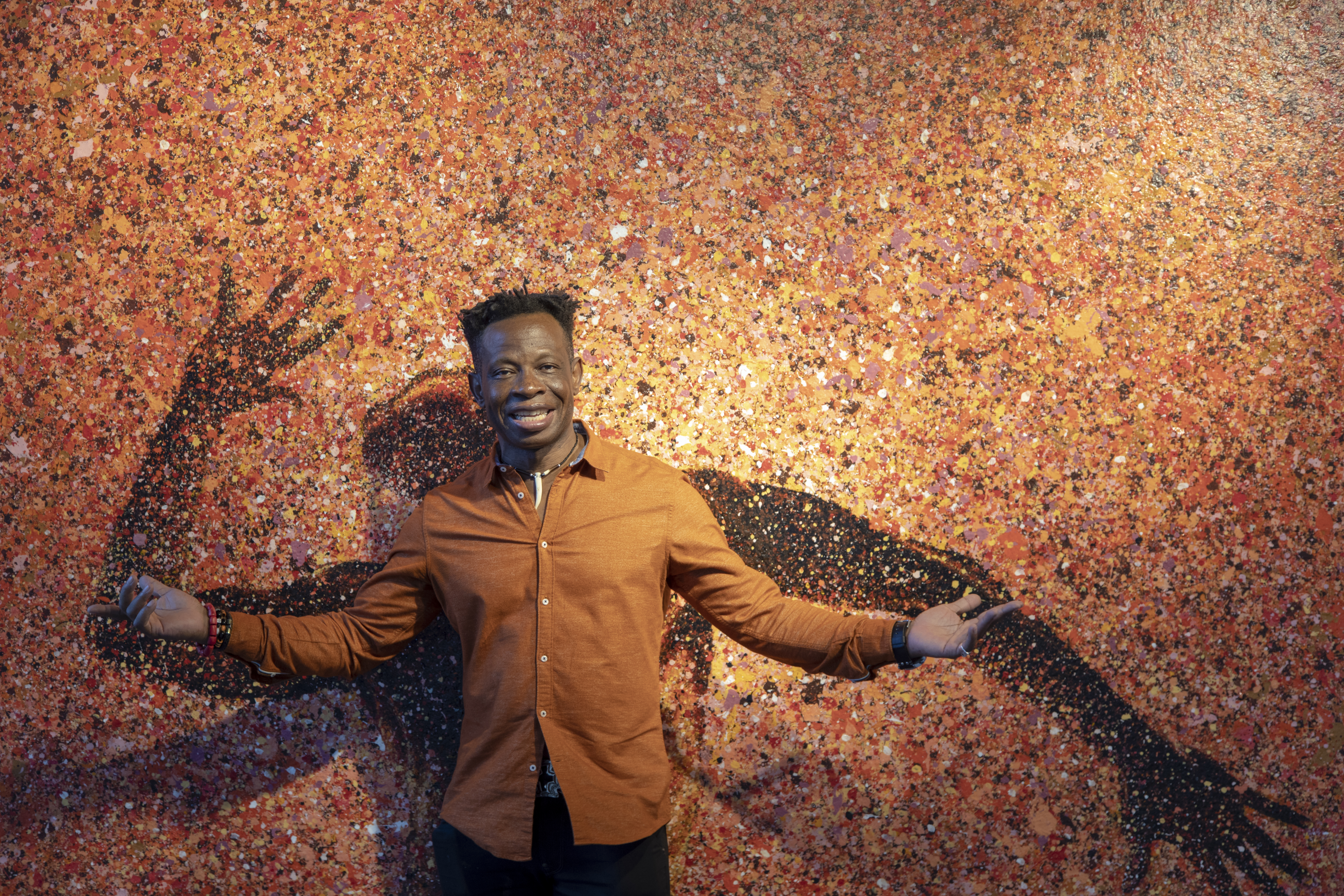
Chidi Kwubiri

Chidi Kwubiri (* 1966 - 26 December 2025 in Umuahia, Nigeria) was a Nigerian-German visual artist.

Chidi Kwubiri was first a guest student in 1993 and shortly thereafter a regular student (painting) at the Kunstakademie Düsseldorf under Michael Buthe. After Buthe's death in 1994, he changed to the masterclass of A. R. Penck and left the Düsseldorf Art Academy in 2002 as a master class student of A. R. Penck.

Since 2000, Kwubiri lived with his family in Pulheim near Cologne, where he had his studio at the WALZWERK, a converted historical industrial complex. Chidi Kwubiri had numerous international solo and group exhibitions in Europe, Africa, the Middle East, and the USA. In 2016 he designed the MISEREOR lenten veil, which has a tradition of over 40 years, for the global MISEREOR Lenten Campaigns 2017/2018

== Exhibitions ==
2020:

- ”blue is hot and red is cold”, Klasse A.R.Penck, Galerie Frank Schlag, Essen, Germany

2019:

- 12th Florence Biennale, Italy
- ”a journey into contemporary AFRICAN ART”, Belvedere Art Space, Beirut, Lebanon
- ”Scattering The Lines – Connecting The Dots “, Cartoon Art Gallery, Dubai, U.A.E.

2018:

- goodwill ambassador MISEREOR 2017/2018 “I am, because you are”
- „motionEmotion“, Gallery 1957, Accra/Ghana (s)
- „LebensWert Arbeit“, Dom-Museum Trier/Germany

2017:

- arthouse auction, Lagos/Nigeria (also 2008 – 2016)

2015:

- 56th Venice Biennale – collateral “italia docet”/Italy

2014:

- Casablanca Biennale/Morocco

2013:

- residency Ifitry/Morocco
- “mother tongue“, temple muse, Lagos/Nigeria (s)

2012:

- paragon gallery, Miami/USA

2010:

- "theme Africa": Phillips de Pury, New York City, United States

2009/10:

- "whip not child": art project against violence on kids (initiator) in co-operation with Deutsche Gesellschaft für Technische Zusammenarbeit (GTZ) and Goethe Institute, Nigeria/Germany

2009:

- OPERA Gallery, Paris, France

2008:

- "reflection", Signature Gallery, Lagos, Nigeria
- Millenia Fine Art, Orlando, Florida, USA

2007:

- Goethe-Institute, Düsseldorf, Germany
- Neues Rathaus. Hannover, Germany
- "Zwei Schritte Voraus" (two steps ahead), Berlin
- Deutsche Gesellschaft für Technische Zusammenarbeit (GTZ), Eschborn, Germany

2006:

- World Market Center, Las Vegas, USA
- Association for Visual Arts (AVA), Cape Town, South Africa
- Gallery ACHT P! PRAVATO, Bonn, Germany (also in 1998)
- Gallery OTT, Düsseldorf, Germany (s),(also in 2003, 2002 and 1997)

2005:

- "back to the roots", Goethe Institute. Lagos, Nigeria (s)
- International Art Fair "Palm Beach Contemporary", Palm Beach, Florida, USA
- Kunsttage Rhein-Erft, Brauweiler Abbey, Germany (also in 2002 and 2001)

2004:

- "The Internationals", Millenia Gallery, Orlando, Florida, USA
- Kunstverein Erftstadt, Altes Stadthaus, Erftstadt-Lechenich, Germany
- Collection National Museum, Tivat, Montenegro
- Second Independent International Biennial of Graphic in St. Petersburg, Russia
- Holland Art Fair, The Hague, Netherlands

2003:

- International art fair "LINEART" (Gallery DE OPSTEKER), Ghent, Belgium
- "Far from the bush", Gallery De Opsteker, Amsterdam and Durgerdam, The Netherlands

2001:

- Artists from Germany, Church Street Gallery, Orlando, Florida, USA
- Landtag Nordrhein-Westfalen, Düsseldorf, Germany

2000:

- Outdoor sculpture project, Skulpturenmeile, Steinhagen, Germany
- UNESCO Headquarters, Paris, France

1999:

- Koelner Bank (two artists), Cologne, Germany
- Jakobskirche (Church of St Jacob), European Art Capital 1999, Weimar, Germany
- Dr. Georg Haar Foundation, European Art Capital 1999, Weimar, Germany

1998:

- project "ConverArt", BICC (Bonn International Center for Conversion)
- Westfälisches Landesmuseum, Münster, Germany
- "art multiple", Düsseldorf, Germany
- Gallery Xenios, Frankfurt/Main, Germany

1993:

- Hedwig and Robert Samuel Foundation, Düsseldorf, Germany; Art sponsorship awards (selection)
