= Umeh Kalu =

Nigerian legal practitioner

Chief Umeh Kalu, SAN

Attorney General of Abia State
- In office 2009–2019
- Governor: Theodore Orji; Okezie Ikpeazu
- Preceded by: Chief Solomon Ukaegbu Akuma
- Succeeded by: Uche Ihediwa

Personal details
- Born: Umeh Kalu Ikwuonwu; 5 August 1961 (age 65) Ohafia, Abia State, Nigeria
- Party: LP
- Education: Imo State University; Nigerian Law School
- Occupation: Lawyer

Umeh Kalu Ikwuonwu (born 5 August 1961) is a Nigerian legal practitioner. He served as the Attorney General of Abia State and Commissioner for Justice of Abia State.

== Early life and education ==
Umeh Kalu was born in Ohafia, Abia State where he went on to complete his primary and secondary education in 1972 and 1978 respectively. He obtained his Bachelor of Law certificate from Imo State University after he graduated in 1985. Umeh was called to the Bar in 1986 after attending the Nigerian Law School.

== Career ==
Umeh Kalu served as the senior special assistant on legal matters to Theodore Orji before he was appointed as the Attorney General and Commissioner for Justice of Abia State during the administrations of Theodore Orji and Okezie Ikpeazu in 2009 and 2015 respectively.

He contested in a failed bid for a seat in the Arochukwu/Bende/Ohafia Federal Constituency in the 2007 general elections.

Umeh Kalu is presently a distinguished member of the Inner Bar as he was elevated to the Rank of Senior Advocate of Nigeria in 2016.
