= Ched Towns =

Australian Paralympic athlete, triathlete and adventurer

Ched Towns (16 February 1951 – 20 January 2000) was a vision-impaired Australian Paralympic athlete, triathlete and adventurer.

== Personal ==
Towns was born on 16 February 1951 in the Sydney suburb of Penrith. He was diagnosed with retinitis pigmentosa at the age of nineteen and by twenty-two experienced night blindness. He married Judy and they had two children – Kane and Carlee. His daughter was also diagnosed with retinitis pigmentosa.

He worked as a therapist, mediator and motivational speaker.

== Sporting career ==
Towns played rugby league for the Penrith Panthers Jersey Flegg Cup team until deteriorating eyesight forced him to leave the sport. He then took up triathlon and in 1982 competed in the Nepean Triathlon with wife Judy on the front of a tandem bike. Towns competed in more than 200 triathlons including eight Ironman events. In 1991, he became the first Australian triathlete with a physical disability to compete in the Hawaiian Ironman. He developed a system whereby his wife, Judy, would swim alongside him and then he would ride a tandem bicycle. His children Kane and Carlee would also guide him in triathlons. He ran in the City2Surf (Sydney) several times.

He took up the javelin under the guidance of Alf Mitchell, who won the men's javelin at the 1962 British Empire and Commonwealth Games in Perth, Western Australia. At the 1988 Seoul Paralympics, he finished fifth in the Men's Javelin B2.

== Adventures ==
In 1993, he was part of the Blind Leading the Blind expedition, along with fellow vision-impaired Paralympian Russell Short and non-disabled athletes Stuart Andrews and Brian Lang. They kayaked across the Torres Strait, from Cape York to Daru, Papua New Guinea, then walked the Kokoda Track. The journey is told through the 1995 documentary The Blind Leading The Blind and the 2004 book Blind leading the blind: a journey of vision across the Torres Strait and Kokoda track. Towns named his Labrador guide dog Kokoda in honour of the expedition.

In 1992, it was reported that he successfully completed the world's first free-fall for a visually impaired person. He rode across the Simpson Desert with his son Kane on a mountain bike for the Paralympic Appeal.

Towns had long dreamed of climbing Mount Everest, the world's highest mountain. In 1999, with the assistance of two mountaineers he climbed Aoraki / Mount Cook and Fox Glacier, in preparation for climbing the Mera Peak, Nepal, which was to prepare him to summit Everest. On 20 January 2000, he died of a suspected heart attack while climbing Mera Peak, assisted by Michael Groom.

Towns's view of life was "You want to get to the end of your days and don't want to be sitting there wishing you had done this or that because it is too late then. You have got to do it now while you're fit enough and you're healthy enough." Towns story was recounted in the video documentary The Moth Loves Doodie.

== Recognition ==
- Ched Towns Reserve at Glenmore Park
- 2000 – Australian Sports Medal for his involvement in a wide variety of sports.
- 2016 – Triathlon Australia Legend
