= Saint Pius X College, Bodo City =

Saint Pius X College

Location
- P.M.B. 4 Bodo City, Rivers State; Nigeria

Information
- Type: Private, all-boys
- Religious affiliation: Roman Catholic
- Established: February 1956
- Principal: Fr. Abel Agbulu C.M.
- Gender: Male
- School phone: (+234) 81 60607005
- Website: spcbodo.com

Saint Pius X College is a private, all-boys, Roman Catholic secondary school in Bodo City, Gokana, Rivers State. Founded in February 1956, Saint Pius X College is located within the Roman Catholic Diocese of Port Harcourt. The school is governed by a board with three members: the director, secretary and the school principal. Former students have formed an association known as the Old Boys Association of Saint Pius X College.

== Admission ==
The school's admission period spans between January and May in which three consecutive exams are conducted. Forms can be obtained through the school authority or the Catholic Education Council Office in D-line, Port Harcourt. Only male students for Junior Secondary School 1 & 2 (JSS1) as well as Senior Secondary School 1 & 2 (SSS1) classes are admitted. JSS1 applicants must have schooled up to Basic 5 and have written their First School Leaving Certificate Examination.

== Notable alumni ==
- Maurice Iwu, former INEC chairman
- Magnus L. Kpakol, economist
