= Government of Abia State =

Supreme governing authority of Abia State

The government of Abia State is the supreme governing authority of Abia State and its local governments, in the Southeastern region of Nigeria. It consists of the executive headed by the governor, the legislative and the judiciary.

== The Executive ==
The Executive is an arm of the Abia State Government that oversees the daily administration of the state and the implementation of bills. The Executive is headed by the Governor of Abia State – who is allowed to appoint special advisers through the Legislative – followed by the Deputy Governor. The other offices which make up the executives are the office of the Secretary to the state government and twenty-three Commissioners.

=== List of ministries and their commissioners sworn in by Governor Okezie Ikpeazu in 2021 ===
Ministry	Incumbent commissioner
Agriculture	Professor Ikechi Mgbeoji
Commerce and Industry	Mrs Uwaoma Olewengwa
Culture and Tourism	Barr Tony Nwanmuo
Education	Barr. Chijioke Mark
Environment	Barr. Sam Nwogu
Basic Education	Chief Ukwu Rocks Emma
Inter Governmental affairs	Prince Obinna Okey
Housing	Chief Chinagorom Nwankpa
Information and Strategy	Barrister Eze Chikamnayo
Justice	Umeh Kalu
Lands and Survey	Dr Chidi Onwuchuruba
Local Government/Chieftaincy Affairs	Prince Christopher Enweremadu
Petroleum	Chief Eze Nwanganga
Public Utilities	Chief Kingsley Imaga
Rural Development and Poverty Reduction	Mazi Donatus Okorie
Science and Technology	Chief Okezie Erondu
Sports	Pascal Karibe Ojigwe
Transport	Chief Godswill Uche Nwanoruo
SME and new business development	Mrs Adaku Uwaoma Onusiriuka Oseiza
Women Affairs and Social Development	Deaconess Rose Urenta
Documentation and Strategic Communication	Mr Ugochukwu Emezue
Youth Development	Barr.Charles Esonu
Lands and Survey	Dr Chidi Onwuchuruba
Homeland Security	Mr. Sopuruchi Bekee
Finance and Economic Development	Philip Nto
Health	O.S Ogah
Homeland Security	Mr. Sopuruchi Bekee
Special duties and Vulnerable groups	Chief Chisom Nwachukwu

== The Legislature ==
The Legislature or state house of assembly of the Abia State Government is the second arm of government concerned with law-making and the passing of bills. Headed by a speaker and consisting of elected members from each constituency of the state, the legislature play a key role in the appointment of state commissioners, Chief judges and other top governmental posts.

== The Judiciary ==
The Judiciary of Abia State consists of 11 departments and also a Judicial Service Commission with statutory duties which includes the promotion and appointment of judicial staffs. It is one of the co-equal arms of the Abia State Government vested with constitutional power to interpret and make laws. It is headed by the Chief Judge of Abia State, who is appointed by the Abia State Governor through the approval of the Abia State House of Assembly.

=== Levels of Court ===
The Abia State courts consist of three levels of court which through their respective judges or magistrates perform law-related functions. The high court determines what case to hear while the other levels of court include the Customary courts, which are presided over by a Chairman and two other court judges, and the Magistrates.
