= Umuahia =

Capital city of Abia State, Nigeria

Umuahia Umuhu-na-Okaiuga (Igbo) Umuahia Ibeku
- City
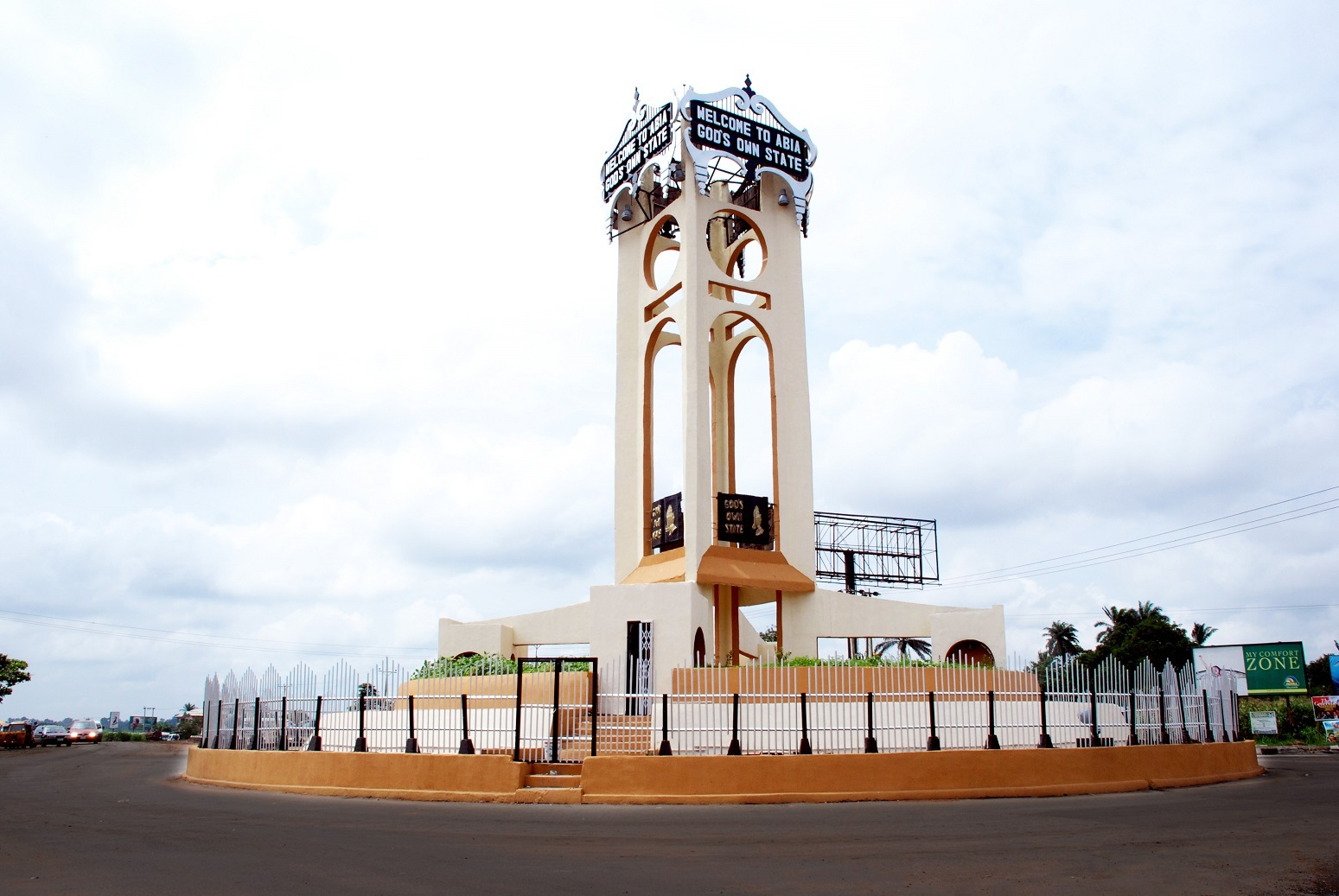
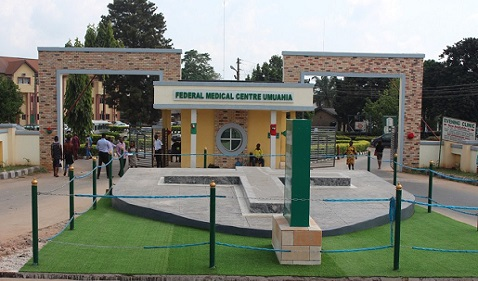
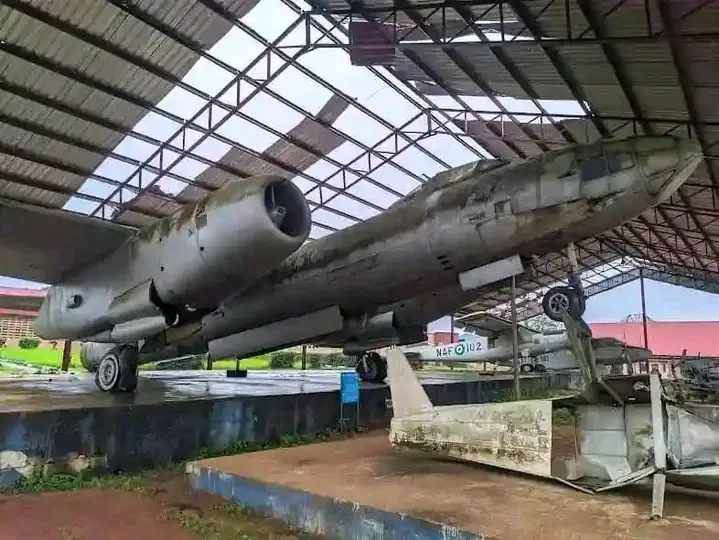
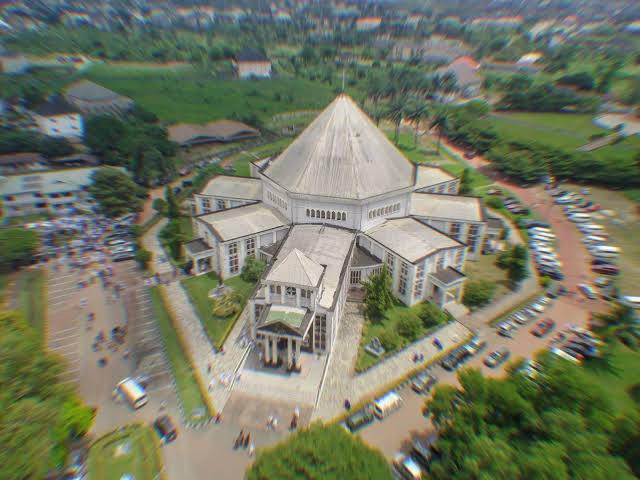
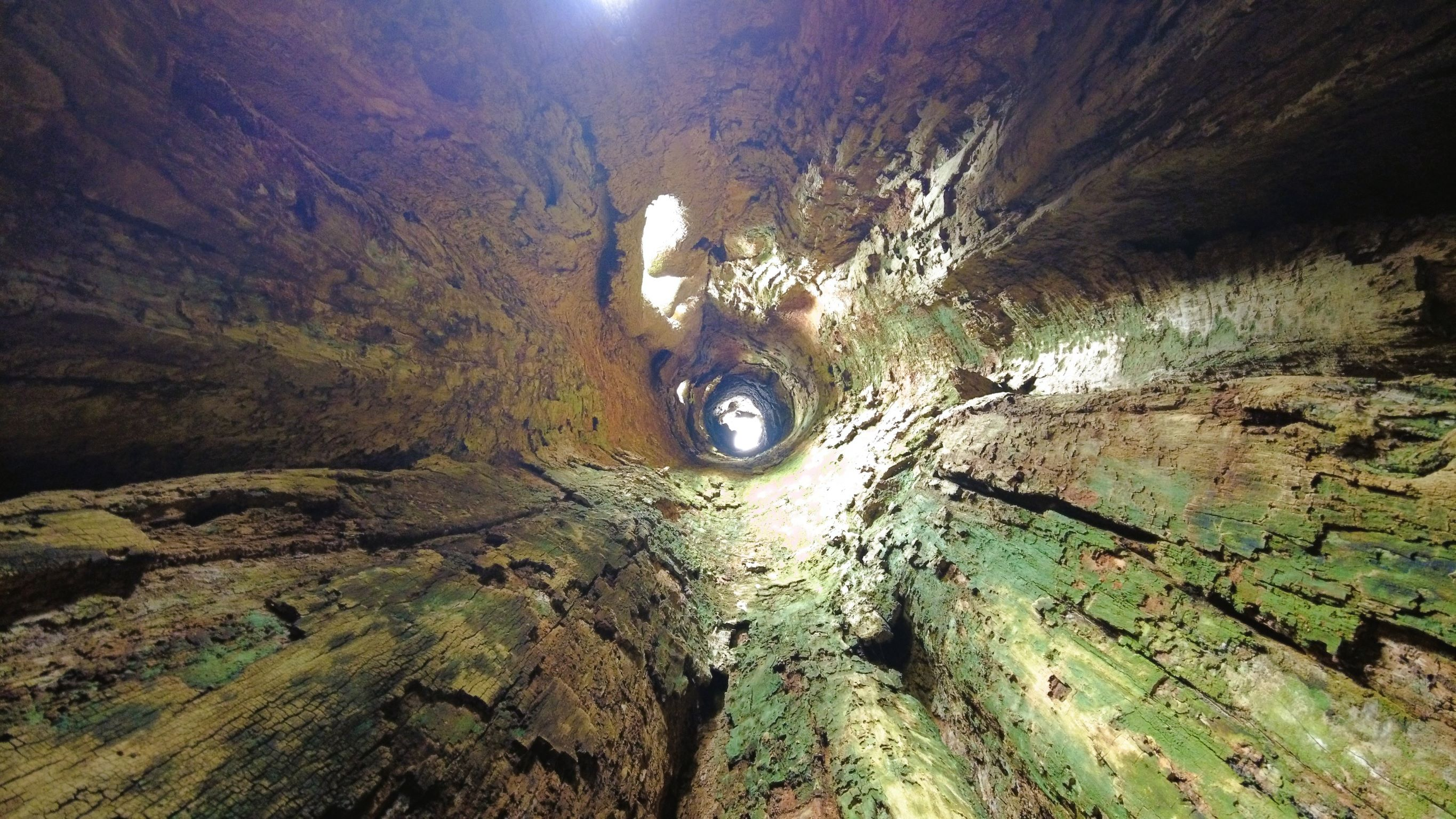
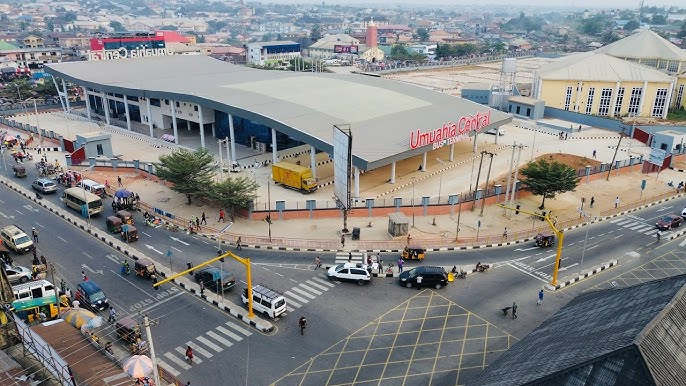
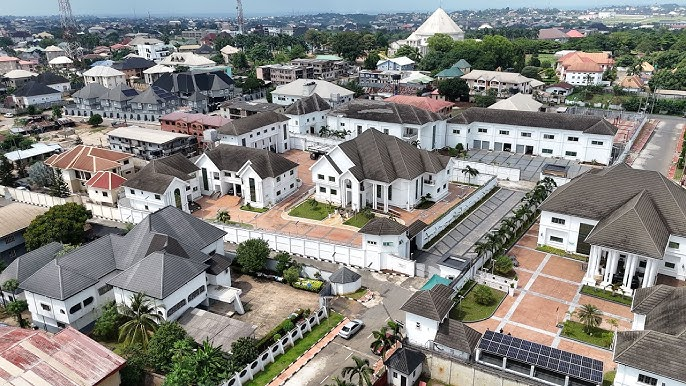
- Abia Tower Federal Medical Centre National War Museum Mater Dei Cathedral Amakama Wooden Cave Central Bus Terminal Residential area in Umuahia
- Nickname: UM TOWN
- Location in Nigeria
- Coordinates: 5°32′N 7°29′E
- Country: Nigeria
- State: Abia State
- LGA: Umuahia North, Umuahia South and has expanded deeply into Ikwuano

Population (2006)
  - Total: 359,230
  - Estimate (2022): 527,400
- Time zone: UTC+1 (WAT)
- Postcode: 440
- Area code: 088
- Climate: Am
- National language: Igbo

Umuahia (pronounced [ʊmʊaːhiaː]) is the capital city of Abia State in southeastern Nigeria. Umuahia is located along the rail road that lies between Port Harcourt to its south, and Enugu city to its north. Umuahia has a population of 359,230 according to the 2006 Nigerian census.

Umuahia is renowned for being a railway and agricultural market center, which attracts traders and farmers from neighboring towns to sell their produce, such as yams, cassava, corn (maize), taro, citrus fruits, and palm oil and kernels. There are industries that help drive its economy, such as a brewery and a palm-oil-processing plant. Nigeria's National Root Crops Research Institute, at Umudike, is adjacent to the town. So also is the Michael Okpara University of Agriculture, Umudike (MOUAU). Umuahia also has several colleges including Trinity College (theological), Government College Umuahia, Holy Rosary Girls Secondary School and hospitals like the Federal Medical Centre, Umuahia (formerly Queen Elizabeth Hospital).

Umuahia comprises two local government areas: Umuahia North and Umuahia South. These local governments are also composed of clans such as the Umuopara, Ibeku, Olokoro, Ubakala and Ohuhu communities.

== History ==
According to popular legend, the name Umuahia derives from the Igbo word AmaAhia or "Ama Ahia", which means "market place or market center", respectively. The British, who arrived the region and annexed it sometime around the mid-to late 19th century, upon learning the name, mistakenly pronounced and spelled it as "Umuahia". Other legends exist regarding the origin of Umuahia, but the foregoing version seems most probable by consensus. In precolonial times, it served as one of the central marketplaces in the region for commerce. Given its serenity and proximity to other towns, such as Ohafia, Abiriba, Ihechiowa, Arochukwu, Obowo, Ngwa, Okigwi, Uzuakoli, Bende, Nnewi, Akwa Akpa (Old Calabar), and Kalabari, merchants of produce, pottery, crafts, textile, traditional medicine, palm wine, and tools travelled from afar, to trade at the busy market center, with many roads leading to it.

However, the name Ama Ahia was not the town's name; rather it was located in a place called Afor Ibeji, near Olokoro Town. With increasing British administrative and commercial activities in the region and yonder, Umuahia, as it came to be known and written, was relocated to Ibeku Town for better oversight by administrative offices and the convergence of roads at Ibeku. The new location became one of the major trading posts along the rail route built by the United African Company (UAC) for carting produce, raw materials, and minerals along the trade route from Sub-Sahara to the Atlantic Ocean, for onward exportation to Europe. The trading post was named Umuahia-Ibeku Station to reflect the new market square and domain. Over time, the area became known as Umuahia, while the original market town at Afor Ibeji was renamed to Old Umuahia. The hyphenated Umuahia-Ibeku became a source of dispute, given that neighboring towns such as Ohuhu, Umuopara, Afugiri, Ofeme, etc., were constituted into the Umuahia administrative area, entitling them to be under Umuahia, not Umuahia – Ibeku, since Ibeku is on the same level as the constituent parts of Umuahia.

Umuahia, though comprising several villages and communities, is composed mainly of five sister clans, socially and phonologically homogenous at most, with each clan having its own version of autonomy, and social evolution.

Umuahia was established by the British colonial administration of Nigeria in the early 20th century. Umuahia was declared the second (and soon became the longest serving) capital, of the short-lived nation of the Republic of Biafra, on 28 September 1967 after the first capital, Enugu was captured by Nigerian troops. On April 22, 1969, Umuahia was occupied and nearly taken by Nigerian troops but were forced to retreat, due to a stiff offensive by Biafran Maj. E.A. Eutuk. After Umuahia's capture on 24 December 1969, the last Biafran capital before its dissolution became Owerri.

Formerly known as Ikwuano/Umuahia Local government council until the Babangida-led government divided it into two LGAs—Ikwuano LGA and Umuahia LGA in 1991—and then later in 1996, the former Umuahia Local Government Area was split by Abacha-led government into two local governments: Umuahia North and Umuahia South. The first executive chairman of the old Umuahia local government area is Chief Chibiko Ukanwoke, elected in December 1991.

== Government ==
=== Umuahia Local Government Areas (LGAs) ===
There are two LGAs in Umuahia, namely; Umuahia North and Umuahia South. Both LGAs are made up of clans, and villages in turn, made up the clans.

The South has three major clans, namely – Ubakala, Olokoro, and Umuopara (until 1949, Umuopara was part of Ohuhu). Some of the communities/villages in Umuahia South constitute what is known as Old Umuahia. The Local Government council Headquarters is located at Apumiri in Ubakala.

The North consists of Ibeku and Ohuhu. Its Local Government council Headquarters is located at Ibeku.

== Climate ==
Umuahia's climate is classified as tropical. During most months of the year, there is significant rainfall in Umuahia. There is only a short dry season. The climate here is classified as Am, by the Köppen-Geiger system. In Umuahia, the average annual temperature is 26.0 °C. Precipitation here averages 2153 mm. Precipitation is the lowest in December, with an average of 15 mm. Most precipitation falls in September, with an average of 322 mm. At an average temperature of 27.5 °C, March is the hottest month of the year. In August, the average temperature is 24.5 °C. It is the lowest average temperature of the whole year.

Climate data for Umuahia (1991–2020)
Month	Jan	Feb	Mar	Apr	May	Jun	Jul	Aug	Sep	Oct	Nov	Dec	Year
Record high °C (°F)	37.2 (99.0)	40 (104)	39 (102)	37.5 (99.5)	36 (97)	34.6 (94.3)	33.4 (92.1)	33 (91)	33 (91)	37 (99)	35 (95)	37 (99)	40.0 (104.0)
Mean daily maximum °C (°F)	33.4 (92.1)	34.6 (94.3)	34.1 (93.4)	33.1 (91.6)	32.1 (89.8)	30.6 (87.1)	29.4 (84.9)	29.2 (84.6)	29.9 (85.8)	30.8 (87.4)	32.2 (90.0)	33.1 (91.6)	31.9 (89.4)
Daily mean °C (°F)	27.7 (81.9)	29.2 (84.6)	29.2 (84.6)	28.5 (83.3)	27.8 (82.0)	26.8 (80.2)	26.1 (79.0)	26.0 (78.8)	26.4 (79.5)	26.9 (80.4)	27.8 (82.0)	27.7 (81.9)	27.5 (81.5)
Mean daily minimum °C (°F)	22.1 (71.8)	23.8 (74.8)	24.3 (75.7)	23.9 (75.0)	23.5 (74.3)	23.0 (73.4)	22.8 (73.0)	22.8 (73.0)	22.9 (73.2)	22.9 (73.2)	23.4 (74.1)	22.4 (72.3)	23.2 (73.8)
Record low °C (°F)	14.2 (57.6)	16 (61)	20.3 (68.5)	19.6 (67.3)	18.3 (64.9)	18 (64)	17 (63)	15 (59)	20 (68)	19.1 (66.4)	17 (63)	14 (57)	14.0 (57.2)
Average precipitation mm (inches)	25.6 (1.01)	51.1 (2.01)	92.5 (3.64)	170.4 (6.71)	282.3 (11.11)	331.0 (13.03)	370.9 (14.60)	330.8 (13.02)	362.7 (14.28)	271.3 (10.68)	67.5 (2.66)	8.2 (0.32)	2,364.2 (93.08)
Average precipitation days (≥ 1.0 mm)	1.2	2.4	5.8	9.3	13.9	15.1	19.4	19.2	18.3	14.9	4.5	0.7	124.7
Average relative humidity (%)	74.5	78.3	85.3	87.6	89.0	90.2	90.3	90.1	90.9	90.7	86.9	77.8	86.0
Source: NOAA

=== Clouds ===
The annual seasonal variation in the average percentage of sky covered by clouds in Umuahia is quite pronounced.

Around November 24 marks the start of Umuahia's clearer season, which lasts for 2.6 months and ends around February 10.

In Umuahia, December is the clearest month of the year, with the sky remaining clear, mostly clear, or partly overcast 41% of the time.

Around February 10 through November 24, there is a 9.4-month period of increased cloud cover.

In Umuahia, April is the month with the most clouds, with the sky being overcast or mostly cloudy 85% of the time on average.

=== Precipitation ===
A day that has at least 0.04 inches of liquid or liquid-equivalent precipitation is considered to be wet. In Umuahia, the likelihood of rainy days fluctuates wildly throughout the year.

From March 28 to November 8 (the wetter season), there is a greater than 44% chance that any given day will be rainy. In Umuahia, September has an average of 25.0 days with at least 1.0 millimetre (0.04 inches) of precipitation, making it the month with the most wet days.

Between November 8 and March 28, or 4.6 months, is the dry season. With an average of just 1.4 days with at least 1.0 millimetre (0.04 inches) of precipitation, January is the month with the fewest wet days in Umuahia.

=== Rainfall ===
Extreme seasonal variations in monthly rainfall are common in Umuahia.

From February 1 to December 12 there are 10 months of rain, with a median 31-day rainfall of at least 13 millimetres (0.5 inches). With an average rainfall of 270 millimetres (10.6 inches), September is the wettest month in Umuahia.

The year's dry spell lasts from December 12 to February 1 for 1.7 months. With an average rainfall of just 7.6 millimetres (0.3 inches), January is the month with the least amount of rain in Umuahia.

== Notable people ==
=== Sports ===
- Felix Anyansi-Agwu - Former Chairman of Enyimba FC and NFF Vice President
- Michael Emenalo - Nigerian sports director and former professional footballer.
- Samuel Chukwueze - Nigeria National Team football player.
- Henry Uche - Nigerian international footballer
- Ifeanyi George - Nigerian professional footballer
- Clement Chukwu - Former Nigerian athlete
- Bright Esieme - Ex-Nigerian national team player
- Osas Idehen - Nigerian professional footballer
- Onyinyechi Mark - Nigerian powerlifter
- Joseph Okezie - Former Nigerian boxer
- Emeka Ogbugh - Professional football player
- Dele Udo - Former Nigerian sprinter
- Ijeoma Ukpabi - Volleyball player

=== Arts ===
- 2Shotz - AfroRap Artiste and music producer
- Bright Chimezie - Highlife Musician
- Don Jazzy - Music executive and Record Producer
- Ejike Asiegbu - Nollywood veteran
- Chelsea Eze - Award-winning Nollywood actress
- OC Ukeje - Lagos based Award-winning Nollywood Actor
- Mike Ezuruonye - Nollywood actor
- Pascal Atuma - Nigerian actor and director
- Waconzy - Musician
- Chinonyerem Odimba - Playwright, director and artistic director
- Emeka Enyiocha (actor)
- Chidi Kwubiri - Nigerian-German visual artist
- Amarachi Okafor - Artist

=== Other ===
- Yagazie Emezi, Award-winning photojournalist
- Okechukwu Enelamah, Medical Doctor, Chartered Accountant, Certified Financial Analyst and former Minister for Trade and Investment (2015–2019)
- John Godson, Polish Lawmaker and Philanthropist
- Uzoma Emenike, Nigerian Ambassador to the United States
- Adaobi Tricia Nwaubani, Award-winning novelist and essayist.
- Akwaeke Emezi, Award-winning novelist
- Anthony Nzeako, professor of electronic engineering
- Michael Okpara, Premier of Nigeria's Eastern Region from 1959 to 1966
- Johnson Aguiyi-Ironsi, Nigeria's Military Officer and Former Head of State.
- Uzodinma Iweala, US based Medical Doctor and acclaimed author of the bestselling book Beasts of No Nation.
- Nnamdi Kanu, founder of the Indigenous People of Biafra (IPOB), a separatist group.
- Nnenna Elendu Ukeje, Prominent politician, a member of the House of Representative for 12 years (2007 - 2019).
- Jerry Eze - Pentecostal Pastor
- John Nwangwu - Nigerian-American Public Health Doctor

== See also ==
- Women's War
- Railway stations in Nigeria
