= Athletics at the 2026 Commonwealth Games – Women's discus throw (F44) =

Women's discus throw (F44) at the 2026 Commonwealth Games
- Venue: Scotstoun Stadium
- Dates: 29 July
- Winning points: 1130

Medalists
gold medal	Goodness Nwachukwu	Nigeria
silver medal	Funmi Oduwaiye	Wales
bronze medal	Bree Cronin	Wales

The women's discus throw (F44) at the 2026 Commonwealth Games, as part of the athletics programme, took place in the Scotstoun Stadium on 29 July 2026.

The event is open to female athletes from a range of classifications - F42, F43, F44, F62, F63 and F64. Reigning champion in the discipline, Goodness Nwachukwu, returns to defend her title.

The event will consist of a stand alone final on the evening session of 29 July. As a cross classification event, the results will be determined by points earned within each classification.

== Background ==
The women's discus throw F44 returns for a second time, having first been held in Birmingham during the 2022 Games. one of sixteen para-athletic events, and one of four throwing events, the event is open to multiple classifications with distances being factored through the classification system. Goodness Nwachukwu, returns to defend her title but will not face silver medalist Sarah Edmiston, who retired shortly after the 2024 Summer Paralympics.

== Schedule ==
The schedule is as follows:

Date	Time	Round
29 July 2026	20:45	Final

All times are British Summer Time (UTC+1)

== Records ==
Prior to this competition, the existing world and Games records in relevant classifications were as follows:

Women's Discus Throw F42
World record	36.56	Goodness Nwachukwu (NGR)	Birmingham, Great Britain	4 August 2022
Commonwealth record	36.56	Goodness Nwachukwu (NGR)	Birmingham, Great Britain	4 August 2022
Games record	36.56	Goodness Nwachukwu (NGR)	Birmingham, Great Britain	4 August 2022
Women's Discus Throw F43
World record	28.92	Vajiheh Houshmand (IRI)	Hangzhou, China	27 October 2023
Women's Discus Throw F44
World record	44.73	Juan Yao (CHN)	Tokyo, Japan	29 August 2021
Games record	34.96	Sarah Edmiston (AUS)	Birmingham, Great Britain	4 August 2022
Women's Discus Throw F63
World record	33.19	Baozhu Zheng (CHN)	Beijing, China	15 September 2008
Games record	20.57	Julie Rogers (WAL)	Birmingham, Great Britain	4 August 2022
Women's Discus Throw F64
World record	41.17	Faustyna Kotlowska (POL)	Warsaw, Poland	17 August 2024

== Qualification ==
Para athletic event qualification is regulated by a special system organised between Commonwealth Sport and the International Paralympic Committee. Each para athletic event allowed for eight quota places, or 10 in the case of throwing events. All but one quota in each event was available on the basis of the Commonwealth Para Rankings on 31 Match 2026, to a maximum of two per Commonwealth Games Association (CGA), with the remaining quota allocated by Bipartite invitation.

This list did not set a limit on entrants, as other athletes in the same classification, but qualified directly for another event, could enter the event in question, up to a maximum (combined quota, invitation and 'separate event' quota) of three per event per CGA.

== Entrants ==
The following Commonwealth Games Associations (CGA) have confirmed entries in this discipline. Further athletes may be declared by further CGA before the competition commences:

- England (2)
- Wales (2)
- Canada (1)
- Nigeria (1)
- South Africa (1)
- Papua New Guinea (1)

== Results ==
=== Final ===
Rank	Name	Sport class	#1	#2	#3	#4	#5	#6	Result	Points	Notes
1st place, gold medalist(s)	Goodness Nwachukwu (NGR)	F42	x	x	26.23	33.12	34.25	39.66	39.66	1130	WR
2nd place, silver medalist(s)	Funmi Oduwaiye (WAL)	F44	38.52	x	x	x	34.89	x	38.52	931	GR, SB
3rd place, bronze medalist(s)	Bree Cronin (WAL)	F44	34.88	x	36.00	x	x	x	36.00	861	SB
4	Addisyn Franceschini (CAN)	F64	28.09	30.27	30.15	32.48	31.91	31.55	32.48	794	PB
5	Destiny Agbo (NGR)	F44	31.26	31.21	32.63	31.37	33.79	27.82	33.79	787	PB
6	Ndidikama Okoh (ENG)	F42	25.28	x	x	25.51	x	24.54	25.51	774	
7	Yane van der Merwe (RSA)	F42	30.91	30.58	x	29.52	12.41	28.67	30.91	676	SB
8	Sylvia Olero (KEN)	F44	29.98	30.19	28.37	29.88	29.75	x	30.19	646	SB
9	Bebe Jackson (ENG)	F44	25.87	x	23.20				25.87	448	
10	Regina Edward (PNG)	F43	19.17	x	18.87				19.17	159	SB
