= Athletics at the 2022 Commonwealth Games – Qualification =

There was a nominal total of 96 quota places available (in parasport events only) for athletics at the 2022 Commonwealth Games; 48 each for men and women.

== Rules ==
Each Commonwealth Games Association (CGA) may qualify up to three places per event, which equates to a maximum quota of thirty-six. Seven places per event are determined by the World Para Athletics (WPA) World Rankings (for performances between 31 December 2020 and 25 April 2022), with the last spot reserved for a Bipartite Invitation; all those who qualify may also enter other events provided the three-per-CGA limit is respected.

The events are open to sport classes as follows:

- Men's 100 metres T12: T11/12
- Men's 100 metres T38: T37/38
- Men's 100 metres T47: T45–47
- Men's 1500 metres T54: T53/54
- Men's marathon T54: T53/54
- Men's discus throw F44/64: F42–44/61–64
- Women's 100 metres T34: T33/34
- Women's 100 metres T38: T37/38
- Women's 1500 metres T54: T53/54
- Women's marathon T54: T53/54
- Women's shot put F57: F55–57
- Women's discus throw F44/64: F42–44/61–64

In addition, all those who qualify for the men's 100 metres T12 event are entitled to compete with a guide, which has no impact on quota allocation.

== Timeline ==
Event	Dates	Location
World Para Athletics World Rankings	31 December 2020 – 25 April 2022	Various locations

== Men's events ==
=== 100 metres T12 ===
Means of qualification	Quotas	Qualified
WPA Rankings	7	Zac Shaw (ENG); Ananias Shikongo (NAM); Jonathan Ntutu (RSA); Jaco Smit (RSA); Guillaume Junior Atangana (CMR); Afiq Ali Hanafiah (MAS); David Johnson (CAN)
Bipartite Invitation	1	Fred Masisa (UGA)
TOTAL	8	

=== 100 metres T38 ===
Means of qualification	Quotas	Qualified
WPA Rankings	7	Thomas Young (ENG); Evan O'Hanlon (AUS); Charl du Toit (RSA); Alexander Thomson (SCO); Shaun Burrows (ENG); Zachary Gingras (CAN); Ross Paterson (SCO)
Bipartite Invitation	1	Rhys Jones (WAL)
TOTAL	8	

=== 100 metres T47 ===
Means of qualification	Quotas	Qualified
WPA Rankings	7	Jaydon Page (AUS); Suwaibidu Galadima (NGR); Ola Abidogun (ENG); Bradley Murere (NAM); Emmanuel Oyinbo-Coker (ENG); James Arnott (ENG); Jonathan Ferguson (JAM)
Bipartite Invitation	3	Anthony Jordan (AUS); Thomas Normandeau (CAN); Shane Hudson (JAM)
TOTAL	10	

=== 1500 metres T54 ===
Means of qualification	Quotas	Qualified
WPA Rankings	7	Daniel Sidbury (ENG); Tristan Smyth (CAN); Josh Cassidy (CAN); Alex Dupont (CAN); Nathan Maguire (ENG); Jake Lappin (AUS); Sam Carter (AUS)
Bipartite Invitation	1	Cédric Ravel (MRI)
TOTAL	8	

=== Marathon T54 ===
Means of qualification	Quotas	Qualified
WPA Rankings	7	Ernst van Dyk (RSA); Johnboy Smith (ENG); David Weir (ENG); Simon Lawson (ENG); Sean Frame (SCO); Tiaan Bosch (RSA); Mark Millar (NIR)
Bipartite Invitation	0	
TOTAL	7	

=== Discus throw F44/64 ===
Means of qualification	Quotas	Qualified
WPA Rankings	7	Dan Greaves (ENG); Harrison Walsh (WAL); Aled Davies (WAL); Devender Kumar (IND); Aneesh Kumar Sunderan Pillai (IND); Devendra Gahlot (IND); Palitha Bandara (SRI)
Bipartite Invitation	2	Kennedy Ezeji (NGR); Shondel Fereira (GRN)
TOTAL	9	

== Women's events ==
=== 100 metres T34 ===
Means of qualification	Quotas	Qualified
WPA Rankings	6	Hannah Cockroft (ENG); Kare Adenegan (ENG); Robyn Lambird (AUS); Fabienne André (ENG); Sarah Clifton-Bligh (AUS); Rosemary Little (AUS)
Bipartite Invitation	0	
TOTAL	8	

=== 100 metres T38 ===
Means of qualification	Quotas	Qualified
WPA Rankings	7	Sophie Hahn (ENG); Olivia Breen (WAL); Rhiannon Clarke (AUS); Ella Pardy (AUS); Ali Smith (ENG); Sheryl James (RSA); Hetty Bartlett (ENG)
Bipartite Invitation	5	Eve Walsh-Dann (NIR); Liezel Gouws (RSA); Indiana Cooper (AUS); Natalie Thirsk (CAN); Anaïs Angeline (MRI)
TOTAL	12	

=== 1500 metres T54 ===
Means of qualification	Quotas	Qualified
WPA Rankings	7	Madison de Rozario (AUS); Marie Alphonse (MRI); Melanie Woods (SCO); Angie Ballard (AUS); Christie Dawes (AUS); Samantha Kinghorn (SCO); Jessica Frotten (CAN)
Bipartite Invitation	1	Nandini Sharma (CAN)
TOTAL	8	

=== Marathon T54 ===
Means of qualification	Quotas	Qualified
WPA Rankings	2	Shelly Oxley-Woods (ENG); Eden Rainbow-Cooper (ENG)
Bipartite Invitation	0	
TOTAL	2	

=== Shot put F57 ===
Means of qualification	Quotas	Qualified
WPA Rankings	7	Eucharia Iyiazi (NGR); Ugochi Alam (NGR); Sharmila (IND); Arlette Mawe Fokoa (CMR); Elie Enock (VAN); Santosh Santosh (IND); Sarah Mickey (CAN)
Bipartite Invitation	3	Poonam Sharma (IND); Julie Charlton (AUS); Martha Potgieter (RSA)
TOTAL	10	

=== Discus throw F44/64 ===
Means of qualification	Quotas	Qualified
WPA Rankings	7	Sarah Edmiston (AUS); Goodness Nwachukwu (NGR); Mandilene Hoffmann (RSA); Yane van der Merwe (RSA); Sylvia Olero (KEN); Stacie Gaston-Monerville (ENG); Litsitso Khotlele (LES)
Bipartite Invitation	4	Anila Izzat Baig (PAK); Julie Rogers (WAL); Naibili Vatunisolo (FIJ); Ishona Charles (GRN)
TOTAL	11	
