= Athletics at the 2022 Commonwealth Games – Women's discus throw (F44)/(F64) =

Women's discus throw (F44)/(F64) at the 2022 Commonwealth Games
- Venue: Alexander Stadium
- Dates: 4 August
- Competitors: 10 from 9 nations
- Winning points: 1103

Medalists
gold medal	Goodness Nwachukwu	Nigeria
silver medal	Sarah Edmiston	Australia
bronze medal	Naibili Vatunisolo	Fiji

The women's discus throw (F44)/(F64) at the 2022 Commonwealth Games, as part of the athletics programme, took place in the Alexander Stadium on 4 August 2022.

== Records ==
Prior to this competition, the existing world and Games records were as follows:

Records F42
World record	Goodness Nwachukwu (NGR)	33.19 m	Ekurhuleni, South Africa	20 March 2022
Records F44
World record	Yao Juan (CHN)	44.73 m	Tokyo, Japan	29 August 2021
Records F63
World record	Zheng Baozhu (CHN)	33.19 m	Beijing, China	9 September 2008

== Schedule ==
The schedule was as follows:

Date	Time	Round
Thuesday 4 August 2022	19:00	Final

All times are British Summer Time (UTC+1)

== Results ==
=== Final ===
The medals were determined in the final.

Rank	Name	Sport class	#1	#2	#3	#4	#5	#6	Result	Points	Notes
1st place, gold medalist(s)	Goodness Nwachukwu (NGR)	F42	34.84	36.56	36.31	29.96	36.38	33.18	36.56	1103	WR
2nd place, silver medalist(s)	Sarah Edmiston (AUS)	F44	33.24	x	34.19	x	34.96	34.41	34.96	877	GR
3rd place, bronze medalist(s)	Naibili Vatunisolo (FIJ)	F42	21.94	x	23.70	20.01	21.65	x	23.70	701	PB
4	Mandilene Hoffmann (RSA)	F44	29.46	27.69	29.93	28.68	29.00	x	29.93	690	
5	Yane van der Merwe (RSA)	F44	28.82	27.07	27.56	27.17	x	x	28.82	640	PB
6	Stacie Gaston-Monerville (ENG)	F44	18.91	23.99	25.26	25.91	27.37	25.11	27.37	572	PB
7	Sylvia Olero (KEN)	F44	20.94	x	23.30	25.72	26.35	25.27	26.35	523	PB
8	Julie Rogers (WAL)	F63	16.88	19.44	19.78	20.57	18.24	x	20.57	640	GR, AR, PB
9	Litsitso Khotlele (LES)	F44	x	22.15	24.02	23.64	24.07	15.30	24.07	410	PB
10	Anila Baig (PAK)	F44	20.55	20.69	18.83	18.11	19.94	18.95	20.69	248	PB
