= Diane Wittry =

American conductor and composer

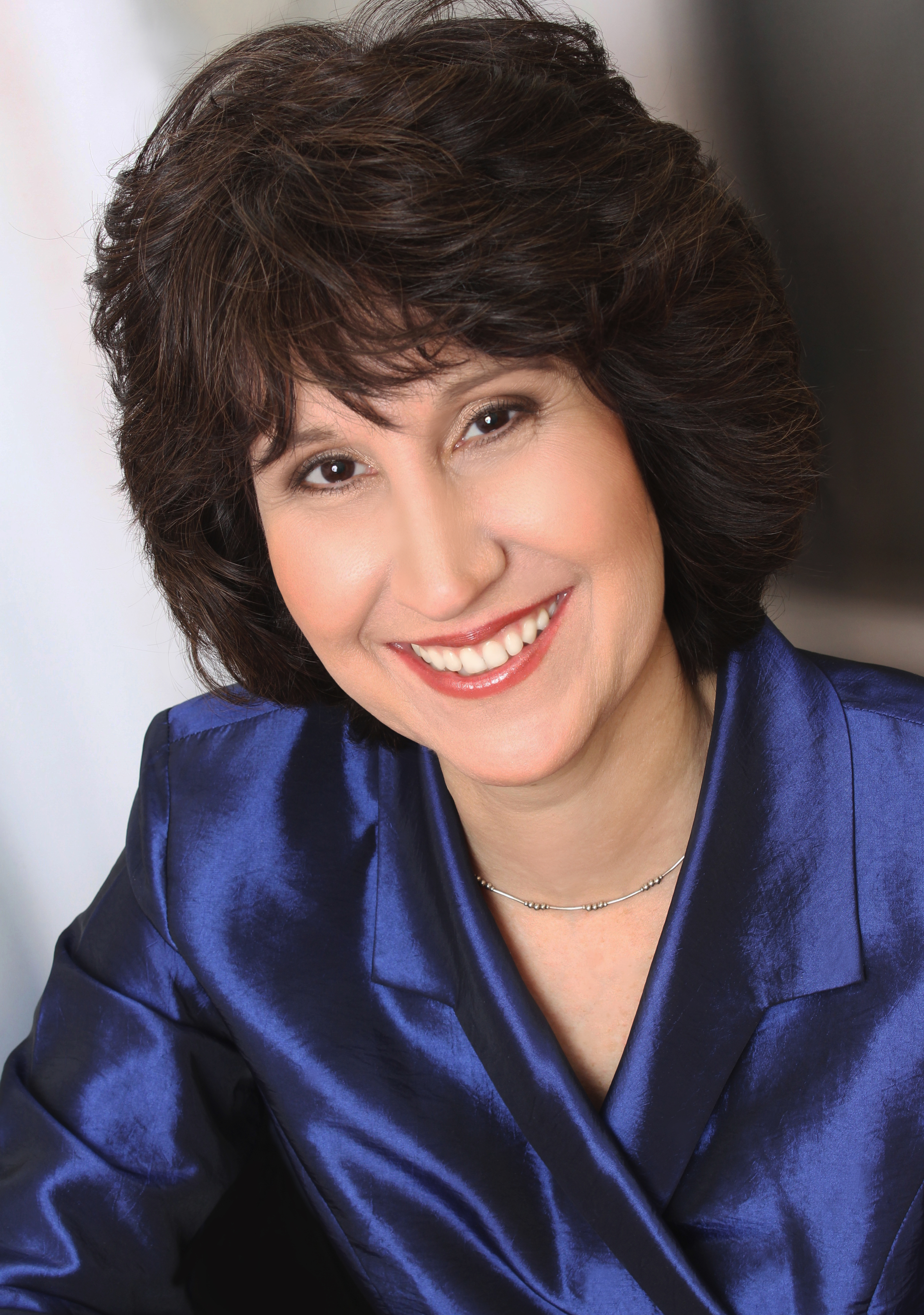
- Wittry in 2014
- Education: University of Southern California
- Occupations: Conductor, composer
- Employer: Allentown Symphony Orchestra

Diane Wittry is an American musical conductor and composer. She is currently the music director and conductor of the Allentown Symphony Orchestra in Allentown, Pennsylvania. She has taught regularly in Conducting Master Classes in the Czech Republic and the United States.

Wittry has been the artistic director for the international cultural exchange program of the Sarajevo Philharmonic Orchestra in Sarajevo. She also was the music director and conductor of the Symphony of Southeast Texas, Beaumont, Texas. From 2001 to 2010, she was artistic director and conductor of the Norwalk Symphony in Norwalk, Connecticut. and, from 2018-2023 she was the music director and conductor of the Garden State Philharmonic (GSP) in Toms River, New Jersey.

== Early life and education ==
Wittry is a graduate of the University of Southern California with a degree in violin and a master's degree in conducting. In 2013, Wittry was named an "Outstanding Alumnus" by USC Thornton School of Music. Wittry studied conducting with Daniel Lewis, and worked closely with Michael Tilson Thomas, Maxwell Davies, Gustav Meier, Leonid Korchmar, and Jorge Mester.

== Career ==
Wittry has conducted concerts all over the world, including in Japan, China, Canada, Bosnia, Poland, Russia, Slovakia, New York, Washington D.C, Connecticut, Wisconsin, and California in addition to her regularly scheduled concerts with the orchestras in Pennsylvania and New Jersey, where she places special emphasis on "connecting her ensembles with their communities". In 2015, Wittry was named one of the "Top-30 Professional Musicians" by Musical America Worldwide.

In the United States, Wittry has led performances by, among others, the Los Angeles Philharmonic, the Buffalo Philharmonic, Florida Philharmonic Orchestra, The Little Orchestra Society, and the symphony orchestras of Milwaukee, San Diego, Houston, Santa Barbara, and others. Her international engagements include concerts with the Sarajevo Philharmonic Orchestra in Bosnia and Herzegovina, the National Symphony Orchestra of Ukraine, Russia's Maikop and Sochi symphony orchestras, Slovakia's State Orchestra in Košice, Italy's Sinfonia Dell’Arte di Firenze, Canada's Niagara Symphony, and Japan's Orchestra Osaka Symphony. She has also conducted at the Ojai Music Festival as well as at the music festivals of Penn's Woods (PA), and I-Park (CT).

=== Allentown Symphony Orchestra ===
When Wittry joined the Allentown Symphony Orchestra she was also the music director and conductor of the Symphony of Southeast Texas and conductor of the Lamar Chamber Orchestra, both in Beaumont, Texas, and assistant conductor of the Pasadena Symphony in Pasadena, California under Jorge Mester.

From 2018-2023, Diane Wittry served as the music director and conductor of the Garden State Philharmonic, a professional orchestra composed of New York City-based musicians that performed concert at the Jersey Shore. In addition to the professional orchestra, Garden State Philharmonic Society sponsors an adult chorus, a three-tiered youth orchestra program and youth chorus, and numerous outreach concerts.

Wittry is the artistic director of Pizazz Music, a group professional musicians and music teachers selected through a competitive process.

=== Compositions ===
In addition to conducting, Wittry has composed several original compositions, including Mist, Lamentoso, After The Rain, Concerto for Homemade Instruments, Ode to Joy Fanfare, Leaves, "Summer Sun" and Holiday Greetings. Her music is published by Theodore Presser Company and Subito Music. Diane Wittry has also created new editions of works by Louise Farrenc including her Overture No. 1, Overture No. 2, and Symphony No. 3. These are published by Peckham Publications.

=== Books and teaching ===
Wittry has written and published two books: Beyond The Baton: What Every Conductor Needs to Know (2007) and Baton Basics: Communicating Music Through Gestures (2014). (Oxford University Press)

Wittry has taught conducting workshops based on her book Beyond the Baton in Connecticut, Ukraine, and Bulgaria. She also has guest lectured at the Juilliard School, the Curtis Institute of Music, Brandeis University, the University of Southern California, and other colleges and universities. She has taught doctoral and masters level orchestral conducting students at Mason Gross School of the Arts at Rutgers University in New Brunswick, New Jersey. She is a guest speaker for national conferences of the Conductors Guild and the League of American Orchestras, and for regional music seminars. She has conducted workshops at the Northwest Pacific Conducting Institute, the Czech Republic International Conducting Workshop, the Texas Conducting Workshop, the South Carolina Conductors Workshop, and the Monteux Conducting School and Music Festival.

=== Awards and recognition ===
Wittry was named among the "30 Top Professionals 2015" by Musical America Worldwide. She has received the American Symphony Orchestra League's Helen M. Thompson Award for outstanding artistic leadership of a regional orchestra; she has been honored as the Outstanding Alumnae for Thornton School of Music at the University of Southern California for 2013; The "Women of Excellence" Award from Beaumont, Texas; and an "Arts Ovation Award" and the "Woman of Distinction Award" from City of Allentown. Wittry is also only the third American to be named a recipient of the Fiorino Doro Award from the city of Vinci, Italy. She has also been the subject of profiles in The New York Times, Newsweek, and featured on a PBS NewsHour.

In 2011, Wittry was named the artistic director for the United States for the international cultural exchange program for classical musicians at the Sarajevo Philharmonic Orchestra and the Bosnian-Herzegovinian American Academy for Arts and Sciences in Chicago. In 2020, Wittry celebrated her 25th Anniversary as the music director of the Allentown Symphony Orchestra, which was founded in 1951 and performs at the 1,100-seat Miller Symphony Hall in Allentown, Pennsylvania. Allentown Symphony Orchestra is one only a few American orchestras to have its concert hall. Wittry has previously been the music director and conductor of the Norwalk Symphony in Norwalk, Connecticut and music director and conductor of the Symphony of Southeast Texas.

Her book Beyond the Baton, published by Oxford University Press about artistic leadership for young conductors and music director, has also been released in paperback. It is the focus of a yearly International Conducting Workshop in Norwalk, Connecticut, which helps emerging conductors put to practical use the elements in the book. Wittry also teaches an international conducting workshop in Pleven, Bulgaria. Beyond the Baton was nominated for a 2007 Pulitzer Prize and an ASCAP Deems Taylor Award in 2007. In 2019, she received the Arts Ovation Award from the Allentown Arts Council for achievement in literary arts in recognition of her two books.
