= Julie Rogers (disambiguation) =

Julie Rogers is a British singer.

Julie Rogers may also refer to:

- Julie Rogers (Paralympian), British para athlete, volleyball player
- Julie Rogers (politician), member of the Michigan House of Representatives
- Julie Rogers (Charlie's Angels), fictional character in Charlie's Angels
- Julie Rogers, character in Sensation Hunters (1945 film)
- Julie Rogers, fictional character in Castle played by Erin Krakow
- Julie Rogers, fictional character in Knight Rider played by Julianne McNamara
- Julie Rogers Theater, Texas
