= Frank Felice =

American composer (born 1961)

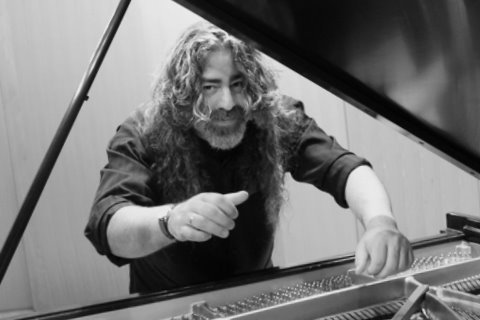
Frank Felice

Frank Felice (born October 13, 1961, in Great Falls, Montana) is an American composer of contemporary classical music and associate professor of composition, theory, and electronic music in the Jordan College of Arts at Butler University.

== Background ==
Felice grew up in Hamilton, Montana, playing piano, guitar, and double bass in a variety of settings, including several rock bands.

He attended Concordia College (Moorhead), the University of Colorado Boulder, and Butler University. Felice received his PhD from the University of Minnesota in 1998.

Felice has studied composition under Dominick Argento, Judith Lang Zaimont, Luiz Gonzalez, James Day, Michael Schelle, and Daniel Breedon. He describes himself as "an eclectic composer who writes with a postmodern mischievousness: pieces can be comedic/ironic, simple/complex, or humble/reverent."

He is member of the Society for Electro-Acoustic Music in the United States, the American Composers Forum, the American Music Center, The Society of Composers Inc., and the Christian Fellowship of Art Music Composers.

== Activities and collaborations ==
=== Performances and commissions ===
Felice's music has been performed in the U.S., Brazil, Argentina, Japan, Greece, Italy, the United Kingdom, Russia, Austria, the Philippines, the Czech Republic, and Hungary.

Commissions have come with funding from the National Endowment for the Arts, the Omaha Symphony, the Indiana Arts Commission, The Indiana Repertory Theatre, Butler University, Dance Kaleidoscope, the Butler University Arts Festival, Music Teachers National Association, the Wyoming State Arts Board, the Indianapolis Youth Symphony, Kappa Kappa Psi/Tau Beta Sigma, any many private sources. He also serves as an adjudicator and judge for a variety of composition contests each year, throughout the United States, as well as lecturing around the Midwest on new music.

Felice directs the annual Electronic Music Festival, which has taken place at Butler University since 2002. Many of his electronic compositions were recorded on Sidewalk Music: Electronic and Electro-Acoustic Music.

=== Philosophy ===
Felice compares composing music to cooking, another of his passions. He says that both involve problem-solving. "It's how you put the ingredients together. Are they going to work?" Of the creative process, Felice says, "Everyone who writes, everyone who composes really is involved with some creation. We echo a little bit of what God did in the very beginning."

Felice inspires his students to be creative and explore their boundaries. He "inspires student composers at Butler University every day to follow through with unique music composition concepts." "Felice's philosophy lends itself nicely to his career as a music educator. Rejecting the Romantic notion of artistic genius, he asserts that, for him, composing is more about form and craft than inspiration and epiphany."

=== Composer-in-residence ===
Felice has served as composer-in-residence with the Symphony of Southeast Texas and Eastern Wyoming College.

=== Dance music ===
Felice has been commissioned twice to write pieces for Dance Kaleidoscope. "Earthworks" (2005) is a suite of electronic music, choreographed by David Hochoy, and performed as part of The Four Elements. "It is a piece that is rich in texture and sonorities and was actually a challenge to choreograph to when I first heard it. It contains some beautifully evocative sections where the combinations of electronic and classical instruments provide a powerful backdrop for the dancers as they create many different landscapes and scenarios." "Of Rivals and Lovers: Ten Lines from a Poet's Past" was written for Dance Kaleidoscope's Remembrance of Things Past performance in 2012.

Another commission was by the Butler University Department of Dance for a ballet entitled The Willow Maiden, which premiered in 2003. Originally, his ballet was to tell the story of Beren and Lúthien, from J. R. R. Tolkien's The Lord of the Rings. After permission from the Tolkien Estate could not be obtained, Ellen Denham wrote a new story, with new mythological elements, to some of Felice's existing music, and The Willow Maiden was successfully premiered in April, 2003.

== Compositions ==
=== Orchestral ===
- Time and Motion (2014)
- Third Suite from The Willow Maiden (2004)
- Entrata! (2002), co-written with Michael Schelle
- The Willow Maiden (2002), ballet
- Three Dances from Romeo & Juliet (1999), chamber orchestra
- Concerto Grosso for Homemade Instruments (1997), for orchestra and homemade instruments
- Crack the Whip! (1992)
- Pre-Sleep Mental Dances (1992), soprano and orchestra
- Adagio (1988)
- Ainúlindalë (1985), symphonic poem
- Nocturne (1985), cello and chamber orchestra

=== Symphonic band / wind ensemble ===
- Power Plays (2013)
- Revolution Calling (2013), brass, percussion, and four-channel fixed media
- Three Fanfares (2007)
- Fanfare and Dances from the Court of the Woodland King (2004)
- Sleight of Band (2000)
- Passage (1997)
- Antics (Pagliacciata) (1996)

=== Mixed chamber ensembles ===
- Exquisite Corpse (fragment) (2010), three unspecified soloists
- le cadaver exquis boira le vin nouveau (2010), three unspecified soloists and piano
- Michael Schelle, ein Porträt (2010), speaker, two percussionists, and piano
- Morning becomes.... (2009), clarinet and cello
- you drive ME nervous.... (2009), flute, horn in F, violin, bass, and percussion
- Charismata (2007), clarinet, alto saxophone, cello, percussion
- Pasta Concerns: Three Lead Sheets (2006), flexible instrumentation
- arcana (2003), flute/alto flute, violin, cello, piano

=== Choral ===
- James Whitcomb Riley Triptych (2014), SSAATTBB
- Nearly Madrigals (2012), SATB
- Voice of the Mountains (2012), SATB and piano
- Heiligenstadt, Oct. 6, 1802 (2011), SSAATTBB
- A Pocket Breviary (2011), SSAATTBB and organ
- Bitterroot Homecoming (2006), SATB
- The Word Made Flesh (2004), a round in four or more parts
- ...in the Melting (2002), SSAATB and clarinet
- Four Christmas Tableaux (2000), SATB and concert band
- Critical Mass (1995–1998), concert mass
- Canticle of Mary (1994), soprano solo and SATB
- My Daughter (1993), SSA and English horn
- Three Autumn Portraits (1990), SATB
- What is Beauty But a Breath? (1984), SATB

=== Vocal solo and duo ===
- If Ever Two Were One (2008), high voice and string quartet
- Letters to Derrick (1995), song cycle for medium voice and piano
- Pre-Sleep Mental Dances (1992), song cycle for high voice and piano or orchestra
- Four Songs of Jennifer Haines (1989), song cycle for medium voice and piano

=== Keyboard ===
- Shichi mata ha (2010), piano solo
- Echolocator (2009, rev. 2010), piano solo
- awakenings (winter) (2008), piano solo for either the left or right hand alone
- three pieces from banff (2006), piano solo
- Rapping Papers (2002), piano solo
- Preludes (1998), piano solo
- Odds and Entities (1992–present), piano solo
- Piano Sonata No. 1 (1991)
- Scherzophrenia (1984), piano solo

=== Woodwind solo/ensemble ===
- The Empty Sky (2011), oboe solo
- Walkin' by Myself (2011), bassoon solo
- Jumping the Shark (2005), clarinet and wind ensemble
- The Wedding at Cana (2004), two flutes
- "...and so the hole was dug" (2001), bassoon and stereo recorded medium
- Fifteen Pieces About Kim Ellis (1999), clarinet solo with mezzo-soprano and percussion obbligato
- Catechism, Criticism, and Wit (1993), saxophone and an unspecified number of performers
- Playground of the Winds (1993), woodwind quintet
- "...a chasing after the wind" (1992), alto flute and piano

=== Brass solo/ensemble ===
- Honk! (2014), horn and piano
- Waiting for Gounod (2004), euphonium and nine string instruments
- Phantoms (1984), trombone/piano duet
- Troll's March (1983), brass quintet

=== String solo/ensemble ===
- Five Whimsies for Non-Grownups (2010), string quartet
- Seven by Three (2009), three e-bowed electric guitars
- Reflection on a Hymn of Thanksgiving (2004), two violins
- Two by Four (2004), three violins and viola
- BRACE YOURSELF LIKE A MAN (2001), solo violin and recorded medium
- Were You Angry with the Rivers (2001), solo double bass
- String Quartet No. 4 (1993)
- Quarks (1991), solo violin
- String Quartet No. 3 (1988)
- String Quartet No. 2 (1986)
- Simple Suite (1984), cello solo
- String Quartet No. 1 (1984)

=== Percussion ===
- Chalk Circle Reel (2009), marimba solo
- now I know in part (2007), violin, cello, and marimba
- Road to Damascus (2006), one player on marimba and assorted percussion
- Basta! (1996), marimba solo
- Up the Creek! (1992), an unspecified amount of performers and a floor that creaks

=== Electronic ===
- ...of glass (2009)
- Earthworks (2005)
- Postlude: Past the Purge Tents (2001)
- Prelude: Purge the Past Tense (2001)
- Psychotica: Six Etudes for the Very, Very Nervous (2001)
- Retrogressions (I, II, III) (2001)
- Sidewalk Music (2001)
- Reflections from The Night Attic (1999)
- When Two or More Are Gathered (2001)

=== Incidental music ===
- Of Lovers and Rivals (Ten Lines from a Poet's Past) (also known as Remembrance of Things Past) (2012), fixed media
- The Caucasian Chalk Circle (2009), six songs for mezzo-soprano, two baritones, marimba, and percussion
- The Lamentations Project (2007), treble women's chorus and recorded medium
- The Turn of the Screw (2003), solo piano with electronic processing, sound effects, and recorded medium
- Metamorphosis (2001), clarinet/bass clarinet, violin/guitar, cello, keyboards, percussion
- Romeo & Juliet (1999), chamber orchestra, three percussionists, two harps, piano/celeste, and strings
