= Bree Cronin =

Welsh Paralympic athlete

Personal information
- Born: Bree Cronin; July 2003 (age 23)

Sport
- Country: United Kingdom
- Sport: Athletics/Paralympic athletics
Medal record
Commonwealth Games
Athletics
Bronze medal – third place	2026 Glasgow	Women's discus throw (F44)

Bree Cronin (born 24 July 2003) is a Welsh Paralympic athlete, who competes in the F44 women's discus event.

Cronin, originally from Newport, Wales, lives in Abertridwr, Caerphilly, where she works as a carer, the same job that her mother does. She trains in Cardiff. At the age of seventeen, she was involved in a car accident that left her with multiple fractures and brain damage, and resulted in her being confined to a wheelchair for a period. Prior to the accident, she had already enjoyed some success in the discus and shot put, and as part of her rehabilitation she took up the sport again. She began a Health and Social Care Level 2 apprenticeship with ACT. At the 2025 World Para Athletics Championships, she finished fifth in the discus F44 class.

At the 2026 Commonwealth Games, she won a bronze medal in the women's discus F44, behind her Welsh team-mate Funmi Oduwaiye.
