= Alexander Stadium =

International Athletics Stadium in Birmingham, England

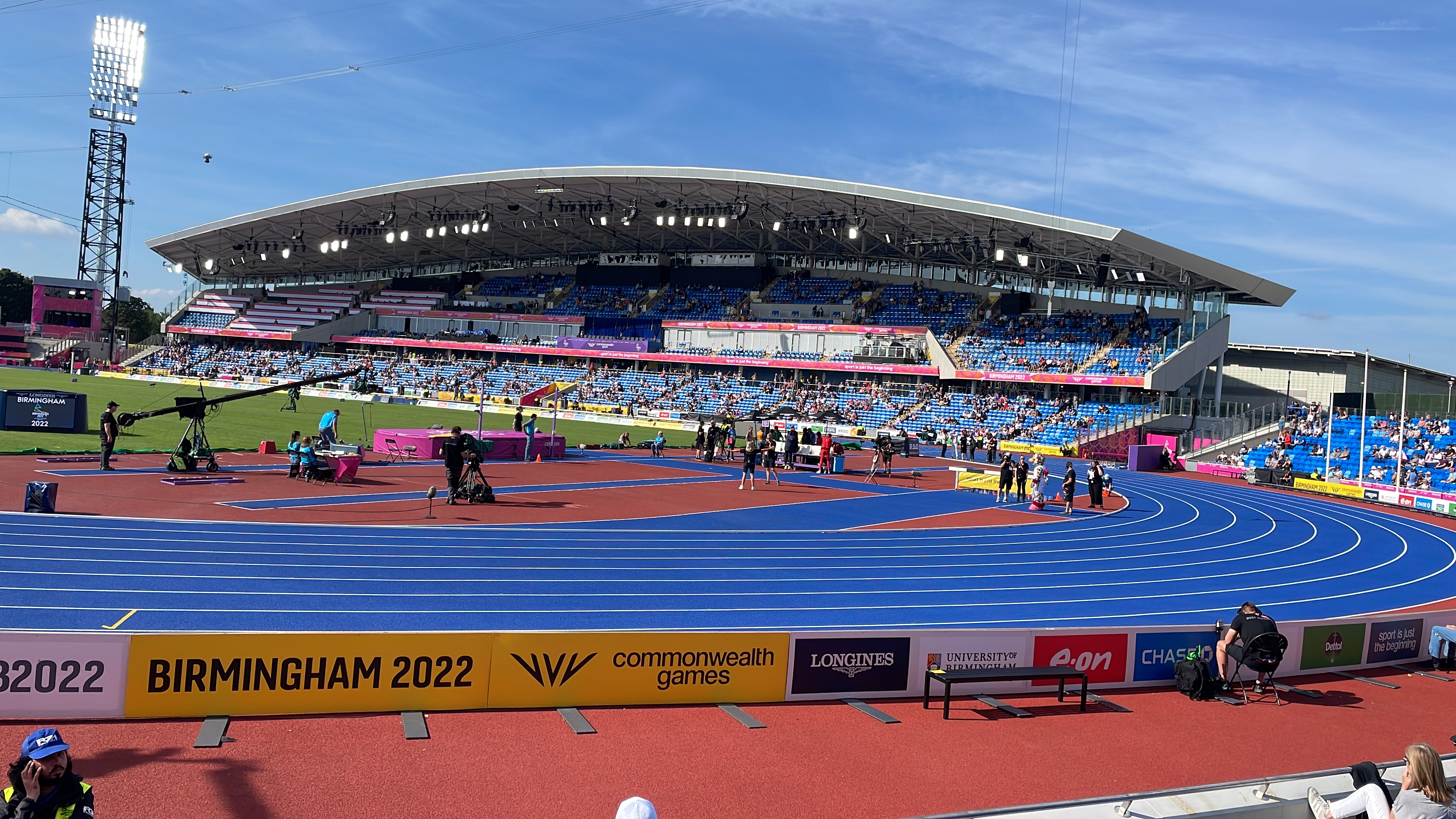
- Alexander Stadium during Birmingham 2022
- Interactive map of Alexander Stadium
- Full name: Alexander Stadium
- Location: Perry Park, Birmingham
- Coordinates: 52.53033°N 1.90561°W
- Owner: Birmingham City Council
- Operator: Birmingham City Council
- Capacity: 18,000; 40,000 (2022 Commonwealth Games)

Construction
- Groundbreaking: 1975
- Opened: 1976
- Expanded: 2009 GMAC 2011 East Stand 2020 West Stand

Tenants
- UK Athletics; Birchfield Harriers; England Monarchs (NFL Europe) (1998); Birmingham City University; Midlands Hurricanes (2023-2025); West Bromwich Albion F.C. Women; West Bromwich Albion U-21

Website
- www.birmingham.gov.uk/alexander www.alexander-stadium.co.uk

Alexander Stadium is an athletics stadium in Perry Barr, Birmingham, United Kingdom. It is the largest athletics stadium in the United Kingdom. The stadium has four stands with a total seated capacity of 18,000. The stadium site has four buildings which include the Gymnastics and Martial Arts Centre (GMAC), High Performance Centre, East Stand and the curved-roofed West Stand. Original construction began in 1975, and the stadium opened in 1976. It is owned and operated by Birmingham City Council.

In May 2020, the stadium underwent a £72 million redevelopment which was completed in April 2022 ahead of the 2022 Commonwealth Games. The venue hosted the opening and closing ceremonies, as well as the athletics and para-athletics competitions of the 2022 Commonwealth Games in Birmingham. The main stadium has a nine lane category 1 World Athletics certified track, and adjoining the stadium is a six lane warm-up track and throws field. The West Stand offers six hospitality boxes and a 450-capacity hospitality lounge with track views, and a multitude of track-level spaces for hire.

Other events held there include the annual British Grand Prix between 2011 and 2019 and in 2022, the Amateur Athletics Association Championships, the 1998 Disability World Athletics Championships, and the English Schools' Athletics Championships. The Stadium also hosted Midlands Hurricanes rugby league team from 2023 to 2025. It is the home Stadium of Athletics Club Birchfield Harriers replacing their former home at Alexander Sports Ground.

The stadium hosted the 2026 European Athletics Championships, the first time the continental championships have been held in the United Kingdom.

== Capacity ==
The stadium currently has a seating capacity of 18,000. Seating capacity is split between Lower, Upper and VIP Box Level seating of the West stand, Lower and Upper seating in the East Stand and Lower Seating stands in the North and South.

Before redevelopment, there were 7,000 covered seats in three separate stands called Main, Knowles (after Dick Knowles), and Nelson (after Doris Nelson Neal OBE), and a 5,000-seater stand on the rear straight.

Event type	Capacity
Sporting events	18,000 (seated) expandable to 40,000 for major events.
Live music events	Approx 20,000

== Commercial Venue ==
Since May 2023, Alexander Stadium has offered a wide range of rooms to hire for corporate, community and sporting events.

Private Hire is available for the following spaces:

Room Name	Capacity	Layout
Box 1	15	Boardroom
Box 2	15	Boardroom
Box 1 & 2 combined	34	Boardroom
Box 3	8	Boardroom
Box 4	8	Boardroom
Box 5	15	Boardroom
Box 6	15	Boardroom
Annex	50	Theatre
Hospitality Lounge	450 350	Theatre Style Banqueting
South Lounge	70	Café
Track Level Rooms	Various	Various

Hire can be organised by via the Stadium Website

== Leisure Facilities ==
Alexander Stadium is open to the public as a Birmingham City Council-run leisure centre. Alexander Stadium offers a range of activities such as Fitness Classes, Martial Arts, Athletics and Gymnastics. Leisure access is available:

Monday to Friday: 7:00am to 9:00pm

Saturday and Sunday: 8:30am to 5:00pm

Classes can be booked via the website or contacting the Stadium directly.

Birmingham City Council also offer a variety of memberships and free activity sessions inline with government initiatives such as Be Active and Passport to Leisure for lower income households within Birmingham.

== Diamond League ==
From 2011 Alexander Stadium hosted the prestigious world athletics Diamond League tour until 2019 ahead of the redevelopment. Birmingham held an event of the 2022 tour on 21 May 2022.

== Music events ==
The stadium has held many music events, including a one-day festival called Party in the Park run by BRMB (now Hits Radio Birmingham) radio that featured acts including Nelly Furtado, Westlife, Natasha Bedingfield, Blue, Sugababes, Debbie McGee, Girls Aloud and The Calling. The event was later moved to Cannon Hill Park where it was in a more central part of the city and so made it easier for people from south Birmingham to attend.

== Expansion ==
=== 2011 ===
In 2011 Alexander Stadium underwent a £12.5 million expansion and refurbishment, including the building of a 5,000-seater stand opposite the current main stand. This took the capacity to 12,700. The new stand has also become home to the offices of UK Athletics. The stand was completed in June 2011, in time to host the Diamond League British Grand Prix in July 2011.

=== 2017–present ===
In June 2017, during the preparation of the Birmingham bid for the 2022 Commonwealth Games, the Birmingham bid committee proposed to renovate Alexander Stadium and use it for hosting the athletics and ceremonies of the Games.

On 11 April 2018, British Prime Minister Theresa May announced that £70 million (approx. US$90 million) of investment would be earmarked to transform the Alexander Stadium into a world-class athletics venue for the 2022 Commonwealth Games, during which it will seat 40,000 spectators. In October 2018, British engineering and designing firm Arup was chosen by the Birmingham City Council to redesign the stadium. British construction firm Mace was chosen to manage the stadium renovation project.

On 21 June 2019, Birmingham City Council released the images and plans for renovating the Alexander Stadium and claimed that it would create a legacy asset for the Perry Barr area.

On 30 January 2020, Birmingham City Council's planning committee approved the renovation plans of the Alexander Stadium which would cost £72 million. After the games, the temporary stands around the track bends were removed, leaving the two permanent stands seating 18,000, with the option of extending to 40,000 for major events. In March 2020, the city council chose the Northern Irish firm McLaughlin & Harvey to redevelop the stadium.

== 2022 Commonwealth Games ==
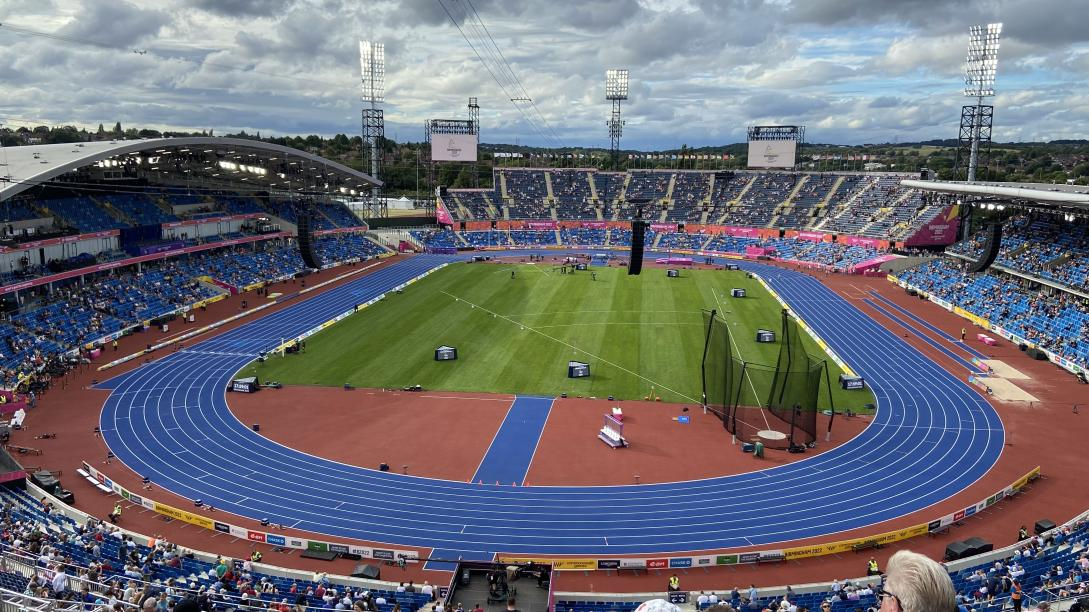
Alexander Stadium during the athletics events at the 2022 Commonwealth Games

Alexander Stadium was the main venue for athletics, para-athletics as well as holding the opening and closing ceremonies of the 2022 Commonwealth Games. The redeveloped stadium included temporary seating and facilities to accommodate the Games.

== 2026 European Athletic Championships ==
Following the awarding of the 2026 European Athletics Championships to Birmingham, Alexander Stadium is serving as the venue for the championships. An extra 5,000 seats in temporary stands were added.

== Incidents ==
On 22 March 2016 fell-runner Lauren Jeska from Lancaster attacked UK Athletics official Ralph Knibbs at the stadium, stabbing him multiple times. Jeska had feared her records in women's events would be quashed due to her transgender identity. She later pleaded guilty to attempted murder and was sentenced to 18 years' imprisonment. She was also convicted of causing actual bodily harm to two bystanders who tried to defend Knibbs.
