= Funmi Oduwaiye =

British para-athlete

Personal information
- Nationality: British
- Born: Oluwafunmilola Oduwaiye; 15 January 2003 (age 23)

Sport
- Sport: Athletics
- Disability class: F64
- Events: Shot put, discus throw

Achievements and titles
- Personal bests: Shot put: 12.11m (New Delhi, 2025); Discus: 33.23m (Cardiff, 2022)
Medal record
Women's para-athletics
Representing Great Britain
World Championships
Bronze medal – third place	2025 New Delhi	Shot put F44
Representing Wales
Commonwealth Games
Silver medal – second place	2026 Glasgow	Discus throw F44

Oluwafunmilola Oduwaiye (born 15 January 2003) is a British para-athlete who competes in shot put and discus throw. She won the bronze medal in the F44 shot put event at the 2025 World Para Athletics Championships and the silver medal in the F44 discus throw at the 2026 Commonwealth Games.

== Early life ==
From Cardiff, she was 11 years old when she joined Cardiff Met Archers basketball side. In 2019, she represented Wales at the Under-18 European Basketball Championships in Moldova and was named one of the players of the tournament. She is of Nigerian descent.

== Career ==
Oduwaiye took up para-athletics in 2022, following multiple surgeries to her legs. An initial surgery to try to correct Genu valgum resulted in a damaged artery, with subsequent surgeries unsuccessful. She was left paralysed in her right leg from the knee down.

Competing at the Welsh Athletics Championships, Oduwaiye threw a new personal best in the shot put of 11.03 metres. That day, she also threw 32.26 metres in the discus. In July 2023, she made her World Para Athletics Championships debut in Paris. She finished sixth in the F64 discus and fourth in the F64 shot put.

In March 2024, Oduwaiye was announced as a subject of a Channel 4 documentary detailing athletes in the run-up to the 2024 Olympic Games, along with other athletes and para-athletes such as Keely Hodgkinson, Hannah Cockroft and Jake Wightman. She finished 5th in the shot put and 8th in the discus throw at the 2024 Summer Paralympics.

On 3 August 2025, Oduwaiye won the national para discus title at the 2025 UK Athletics Championships in Birmingham. In October 2025, she competed at the 2025 World Para Athletics Championships and won the bronze medal in the F44 shot put event, with a personal best throw of 12.11 metres.

At the 2026 British Universities and Colleges Sport (BUCS) Outdoor Championships Oduwaiye won the ambulant women's (1 kg) discus with a throw of 36.75m and the ambulant women's shot put (4 kg) with 11.26m. Oduwaiye won the silver medal representing Wales in the F44 discus throw at the 2026 Commonwealth Games after throwing a Games' Record in the first round before being ultimately usurped at the top of the leaderboard by defending champion Goodness Nwachukwu throwing a new world record.
