= Allentown Symphony Orchestra =

US orchestra

- Orchestra
- Allentown Symphony Orchestra logo
- Founded: 1951
- Location: 23 N. 6th Street, Allentown, Pennsylvania, U.S.
- Principal conductor: Diane Wittry
- Website: Miller Symphony Hall

Donald Voorhees, the Allentown Symphony Orchestra's conductor from 1951 to 1983

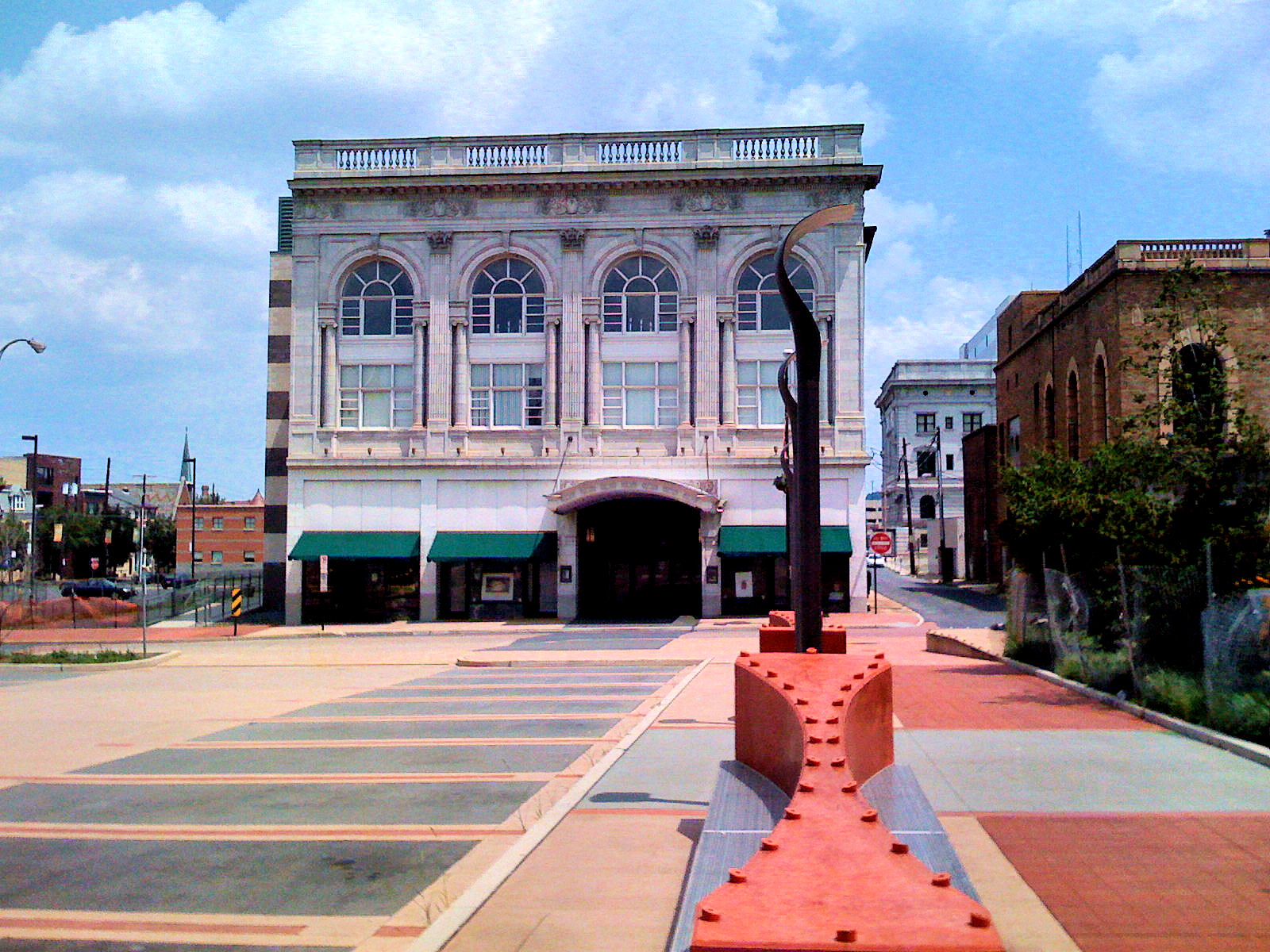
Miller Symphony Hall in Allentown, home to the Allentown Symphony Orchestra

The Allentown Symphony Orchestra is an American symphony orchestra based in Allentown, Pennsylvania. Founded in 1951, the orchestra's current home is the 1200-seat Miller Symphony Hall, located in downtown Allentown. The orchestra is the smallest symphony orchestra in the United States to own its own performance hall.

The orchestra performs five subscription concerts per year. In addition, its educational, youth and family concerts reach more than 5,000 children each year. The orchestra also hosts the Symphony Ball, which for decades has been a leading annual social event in the Lehigh Valley.

== History ==
The Allentown Symphony has had only three music directors throughout its history. Donald Voorhees, a native of Allentown, was the orchestra's first music director, from 1951 to 1983. Under his direction, the orchestra collaborated with such guest musicians as Plácido Domingo, Phyllis Curtin, Rudolf Serkin, John Corigliano, Benny Goodman. William Smith, assistant conductor of the Philadelphia Orchestra, directed the orchestra from 1984 until his death in March 1993.

In 1995, the orchestra appointed Diane Wittry as its third music director and conductor. During Wittry's tenure, the Allentown Symphony Chorus was established in 2014. Other initiatives during Wittry's tenure have included a conducting fellows programme begun in 2010, the 'El Sistema Lehigh Valley' education programme started in 2011, and a composer-in-residence programme and a "Composer Collaborative" programme both established in 2020. In January 2026, the orchestra announced that Wittry is to retire as its music director at the close of the 2027–2028 season, with her final concert as music director scheduled for the autumn of 2027.

=== Schadt string competition ===
Established in 1997, the Edwin H. and Leigh W. Schadt String Competition is a national solo string competition run by the Allentown Symphony Orchestra. The competition alternates each year between violin, cello and classical guitar. Prizes range from US$2,500 to US$12,000, with the first prize recipient also receiving a solo concerto engagement with the orchestra. The competition is named for, and underwritten by a trust established by Edwin H. Schadt (1910–1994) and Leigh W. Schadt (1904–1996), sons of a wealthy Lehigh Valley grocery wholesaler.

== Music directors ==
- Donald Voorhees (1951–1983)
- William Smith (1984–1993)
- Diane Wittry (1995–present)
