= Strand Theater (Allentown, Pennsylvania) =

- The Cinema
- The Strand (Cinema) Theater building in June 1987 still retaining its marquee from the 1940s. Note the ticket booth also remains.
- Interactive map of Strand Theater
- Address: 14-16 North 8th Street; Allentown, Pennsylvania, 18103; United States
- Coordinates: 40°36′07″N 075°28′26″W
- Capacity: 794
- Type: Theater
- Current use: Retail/Office space

Construction
- Opened: 1917
- Closed: 1953
- Demolished: 1987 (Auditorium)

The Strand Theater is a former cinema in Allentown, Pennsylvania. It closed in 1953. Today, part of the building is used for retail and office space.

== History ==
During World War I, Allentown, Pennsylvania was the home of a large Army training camp, Camp Crane, where thousands of recruits were indoctrinated into the military as ambulance drivers before being sent overseas to France. The Lyric Theater, located at 23 North 6th St was primarily a stage theater, however it was adapted to show silent films to entertain the troops that came into the city for recreation.

Oliver "Ollie" Gernert, the treasurer of the Lyric, took note that when the Lyric showed a movie, it was packed with soldiers, but when it presented a play or Vaudeville show, many seats were empty. Gernert believed that a cinema-only theater would be extremely profitable, and if it owned by someone who worked for the Lyric, there would be no conflict of interest as the Lyric could continue to present stage shows.

Named "The Strand", construction was financed by some local businessmen, including a local dentist, Dr. Benjamin Stuckert, who became Gernert's business partner. The cinema was erected during the summer of 1917, and it opened to a full auditorium on 8 October of that year. The first film shown in the theater was Betsy Ross, with Alice Brady, John Bowers and Lillian Cook.

A headline in the local newspaper The Morning Call stated that "Strand, Beautiful Play-House, Open. It was noted that the Strand would be an exclusive modern full-time movie theater, like those in New York and Philadelphia". Unlike the Lyric, it would not present vaudeville stage shows or plays. It was reported that "... The interior decorations of the theater are everything that has been claimed for them... the lighting system is unique for a playhouse in this city, the screen is exceptionally large and the picture areas as clear as life." To accompany the silent films, the theater had a large organ with a full-time organist.

The beliefs of Oliver Gernet turned out to be correct, as The Strand was a popular theater after World War I when the city returned to a peacetime economy. It adapted itself to sound movies about 1929/30, showing the popular films of the day. It also developed an automatic curtain control system which raised the curtain in front of the screen using electric motors, controlled from the projection booth. Prior to that it was done manually by stagehands. The Allentown Devices Company patented the technology and it was sold to cinemas around the country.

In 1930, the property was leased to an A.R. Boyd Enterprises, and it was renamed "The Cinema", who operated the theater for the next 23 years. After World War II, the advent of television affected the movie theater industry, and by 1953, the "Cinema" was showing films to a largely-empty auditorium. The Royal African Rifles opened in September 1953 with Louis Hayward, Veronica Hurst and Michael Pate. It was the last film shown in the theater, and it was closed.

=== Post cinema uses ===
In early 1954, the property was sold by the Gernert and Stuckert estates to the Farr Brothers, Company. The Farr family had been in the shoe manufacturing and retail business in Allentown since June 1862, and owned a large retail and office building across the street. The Farr company converted the theater lobby into a shoe repair shop and the auditorium was converted into a large warehouse, shipping and receiving facility for the shoes manufactured by the company. Later, the shoe repair shop was converted into various retail stores in the lobby section which operated separately from the Farr warehouse operations in the former auditorium.

In the late 1980s, the Farr family was getting out of the shoe business, and the Strand property was sold in 1986 for $140,000 to Donald P. Miller, owner of the "Park & Shop" company that operated a series of parking lots in the downtown Allentown central business district. Miller had previously purchased the adjacent property at 18 North 8th and the former Earle Theater*** at 20 North 8th which had been operated as a Park & Shop parking lot since 1961. Miller combined the three properties and tore down the auditorium portion of the Strand Theater building to expand the parking lot. However, the front lobby section of the Strand building would be retained as retail space (it was, at the time, a book store), and the two upper stories would be rented to become professional offices. Miller also stated that he would eventually sell the building and retain the parking area. When the auditorium section was being torn down in 1987, photos taken at the time show that the seats were removed in 1954 to accommodate the warehouse space, however the interior walls with ornate plaster, remained until the demolition. Also the entrance from the lobby was only walled off with some plywood, and a single steel door remained between the lobby and auditorium.

*** The Earle Theater opened on 15 December 1927 at 20 North 8th Street, two doors north of the Strand. It was notable as the Earle was the first cinema in Allentown equipped with the first synchronized sound system for films.

=== Current use ===
In 2005, the remaining building, now reduced in size, was purchased by Steve Stelzman, a mortgage broker. It was purchased for $165,000 and plans were made to renovate the property and to turn it into office space. The interior of the building was completely gutted and rebuilt. "The Cinema" marquee, dating to the late 1940s, formerly having red letters with white interior lights along its top edges was used afterwards for advertising the various retail stores that were located in the former theater lobby was still attached to the front of the building. Unfortunately by 2005, it had deteriorated to the point that it had to be removed.

Today, the remains of the 1917 building is fully renovated inside and with a new glass facade on the outside. The traditional front of the building as constructed in 1917 remains "The Strand", still in carved stone remains along the top of the roofline, with the masonry restored and repointed.

== See also ==
- List of historic places in Allentown, Pennsylvania
