= Donald Voorhees (conductor) =

American conductor

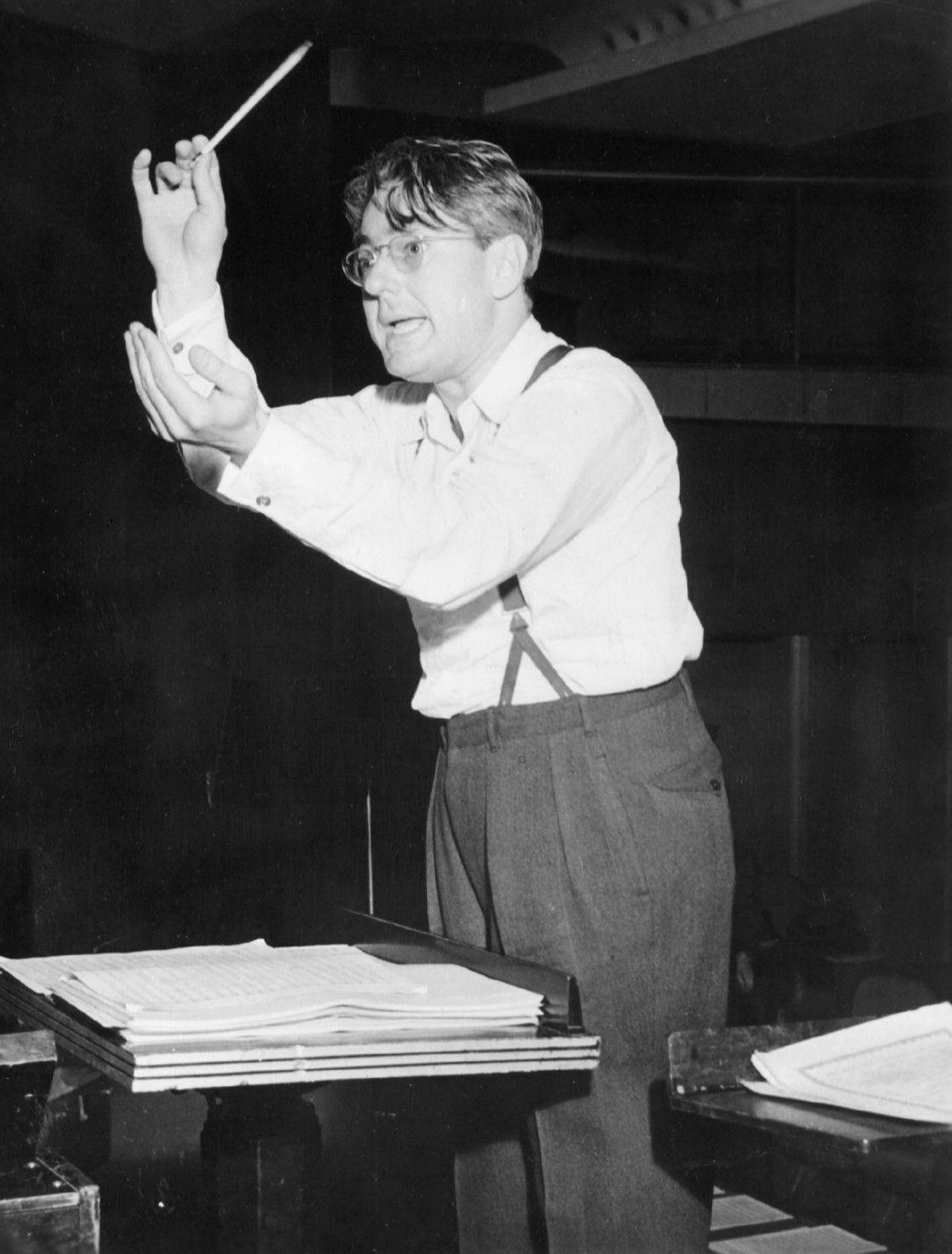
- Voorhees performing on The Bell Telephone Hour on NBC Radio Network in the 1940s
- Born: July 26, 1903; Allentown, Pennsylvania, U.S.
- Died: January 10, 1989 (aged 85); Cape May Court House, New Jersey, U.S.
- Education: William Allen High School
- Occupations: Musical conductor and composer
- Years active: 1926–1983

Donald Voorhees (July 26, 1903– January 10, 1989) was an American composer and conductor who received an Emmy Award nomination for "Individual Achievements in Music" for his work on the television series, The Bell Telephone Hour.

== Early life and education ==
Voorhees was born on July 26, 1903, in Allentown, Pennsylvania. He was described as a musical prodigy who had first conducted at age 11 at a church. Voorhees graduated from William Allen High School in 1919.

== Career ==
Voorhees formed an orchestra in 1926, which recorded for Columbia, Edison, Pathé, Perfect, Cameo, and Hit of the Week. He played the piano in orchestra's early recordings. The orchestra folded when Voorhees left to begin his radio career in 1931. His first radio broadcast work was NBC Radio Network's The Texaco Fire Chief Show, which starred comedian Ed Wynn. Voorhees also performed on Maxwell House Show Boat and, in 1933, Captain Henry's Show Boat.

From 1935 to 1941, and from 1949 to 1953 with Ardon Cornwell, Voorhees was the musical director and conductor for the radio and television show, Cavalcade of America.

Voorhees also served as conductor of The Bell Telephone Hour orchestra for 26 years, from its first broadcasts on radio in 1942 until its final television episode in 1968. He conducted La bohème (Italian: [la boˈɛm]), Mimi/Marcello Act 3 duet, by composer Giacomo Puccini in 1946. Voorhees was nominated for an Emmy Award in 1966 for "Individual Achievements in Music" for his work on the series.

Voorhees was the first conductor of the Allentown Symphony Orchestra in his native Allentown, Pennsylvania, serving as conductor and musical director of the orchestra from its inception in 1951 until 1983.

Voorhees retired on November 20, 1983.

== Personal life and death ==
Voorhees was a resident of Stone Harbor, New Jersey. He and composer Marvin Hamlisch were not friends according to Hamlisch. Voorhees died of pneumonia on January 10, 1989, in Cape May Court House, New Jersey, at age 85.
