= Julie Rogers Theatre =

- City Hall and Auditorium
- U.S. Historic district – Contributing property
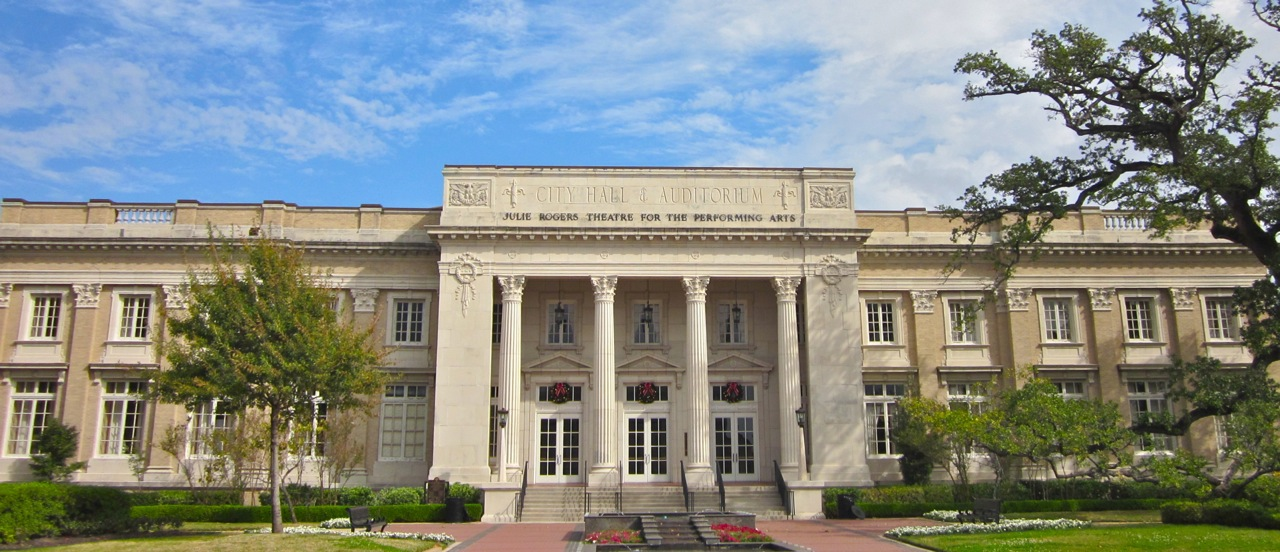
- Julie Rogers Theatre in 2011

- Location within Texas Location within the United States
- Location: 700 Pearl St., Beaumont, Texas
- Coordinates: 30°04′54.5″N 94°05′45.3″W
- Area: 3.0 acres (1.2 ha)
- Built: 1928
- Architects: Douglass E. Steinman, F.W. Steinman
- Architectural style: Classical Revival
- Website: Julie Rogers Theatre
- Part of: Beaumont Commercial District (ID78002959)
- Designated CP: April 14, 1978

The Julie Rogers Theatre is a historic performing arts theatre located on Pearl Street in downtown Beaumont, Texas. Built in 1928, the theatre was once Beaumont's City Hall and Auditorium. The capacity is approximately 1,663 seats.

== Renovations ==
The building was renovated in 1982 when it was re-purposed from the city hall and auditorium combination to a theatre for the performing arts. The theatre was renovated again in 2007. It now features continental seating (no center aisle). Seating includes 1,253 seats in orchestra seating, 144 seats in loge seating, and 266 seats in balcony seating.

== Performances ==
This facility is home to the Symphony of Southeast Texas, and hosts performances of the Beaumont Civic Opera, the Beaumont Civic Ballet and the Beaumont Ballet Theatre.

== Photo gallery ==
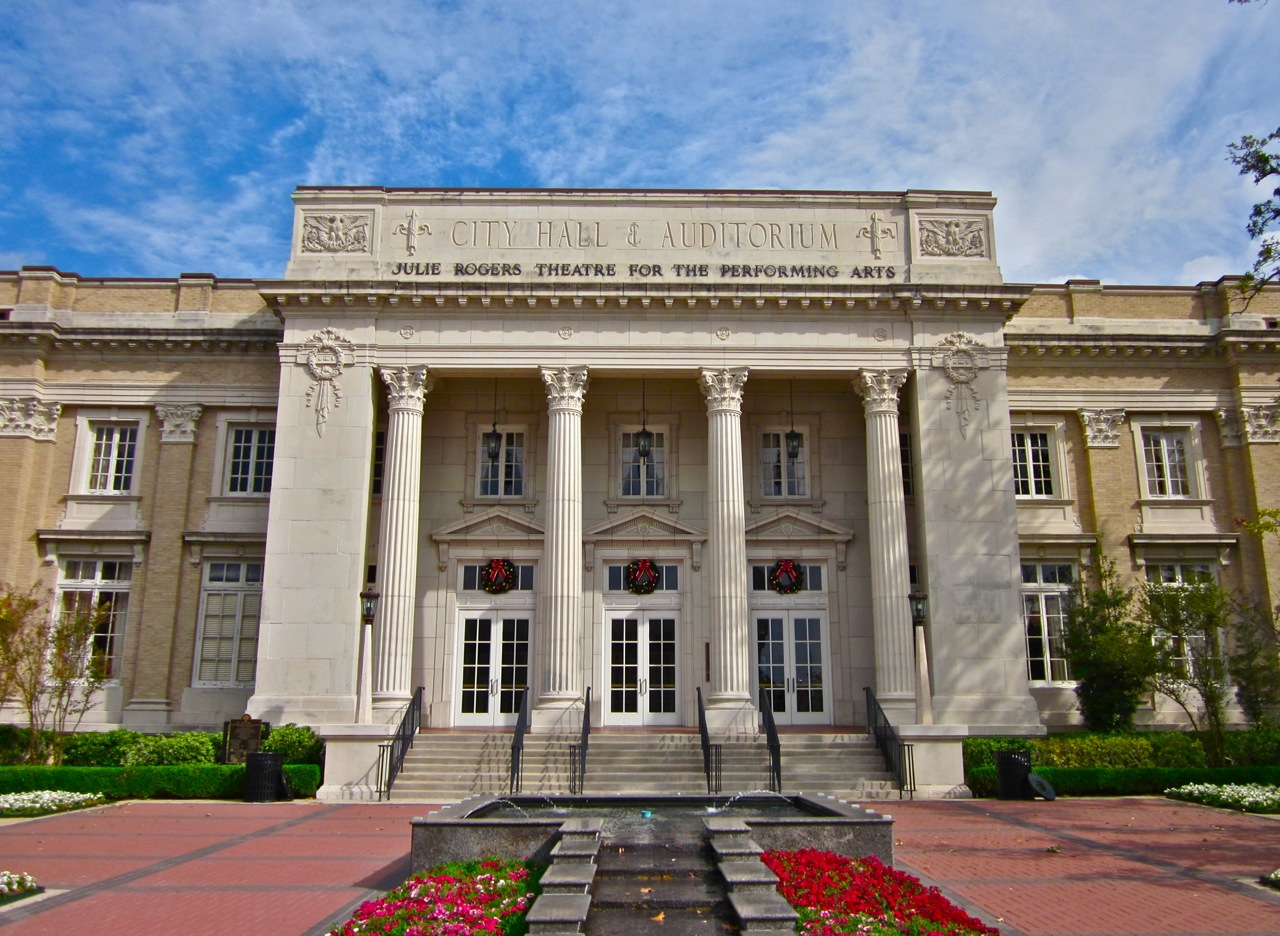
The main entrance

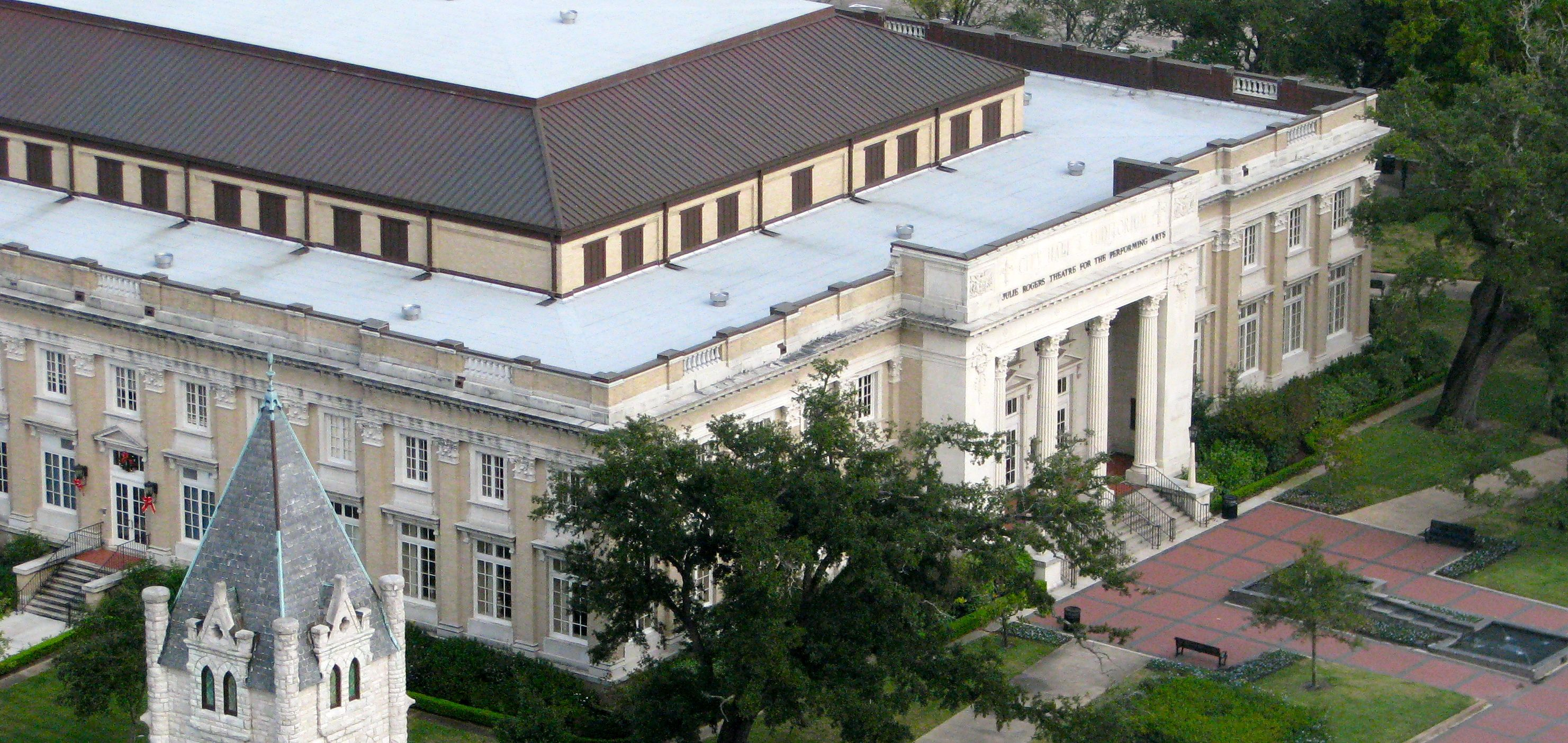
The Julie from the San Jacinto Building

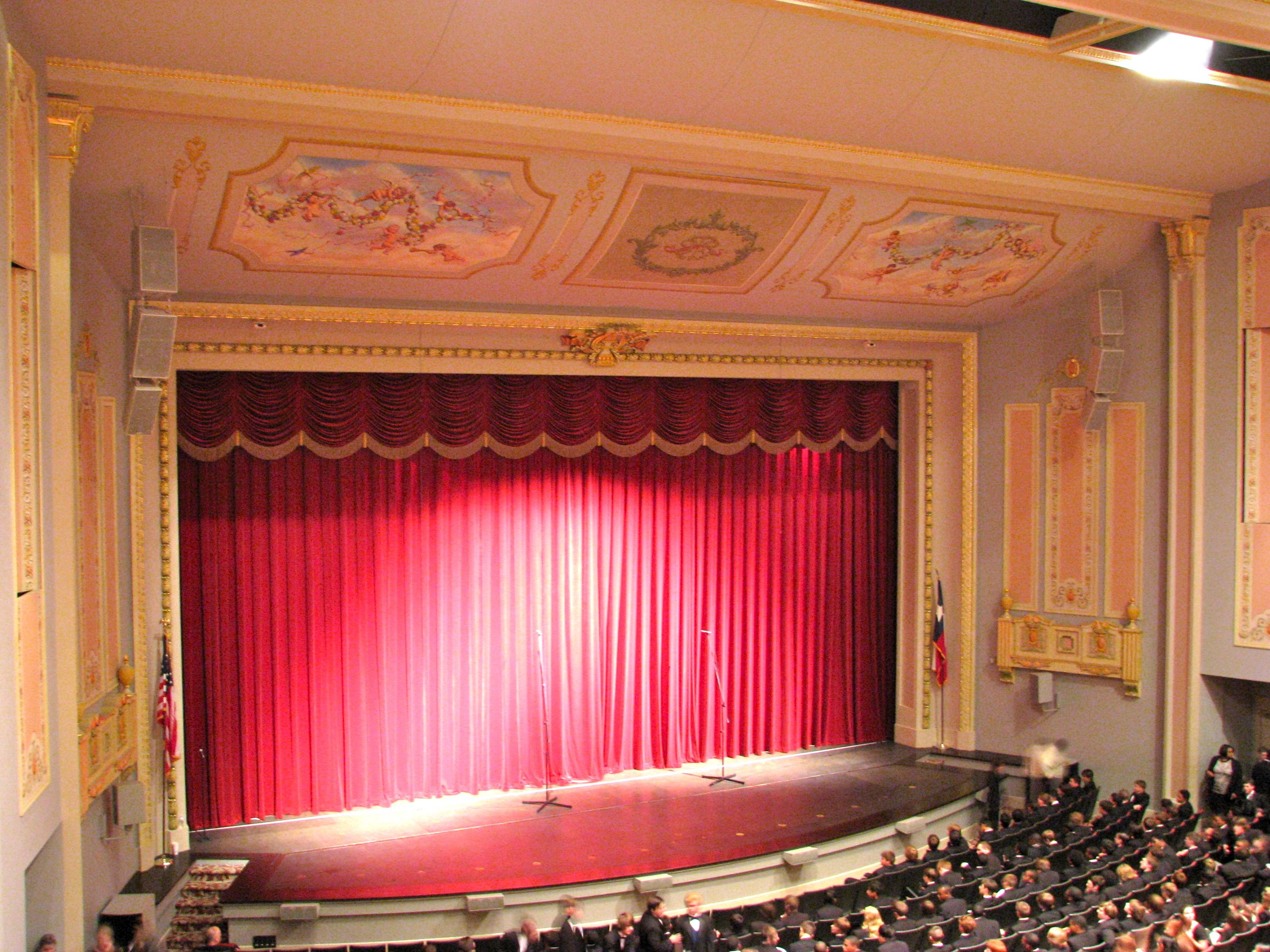
The Auditorium

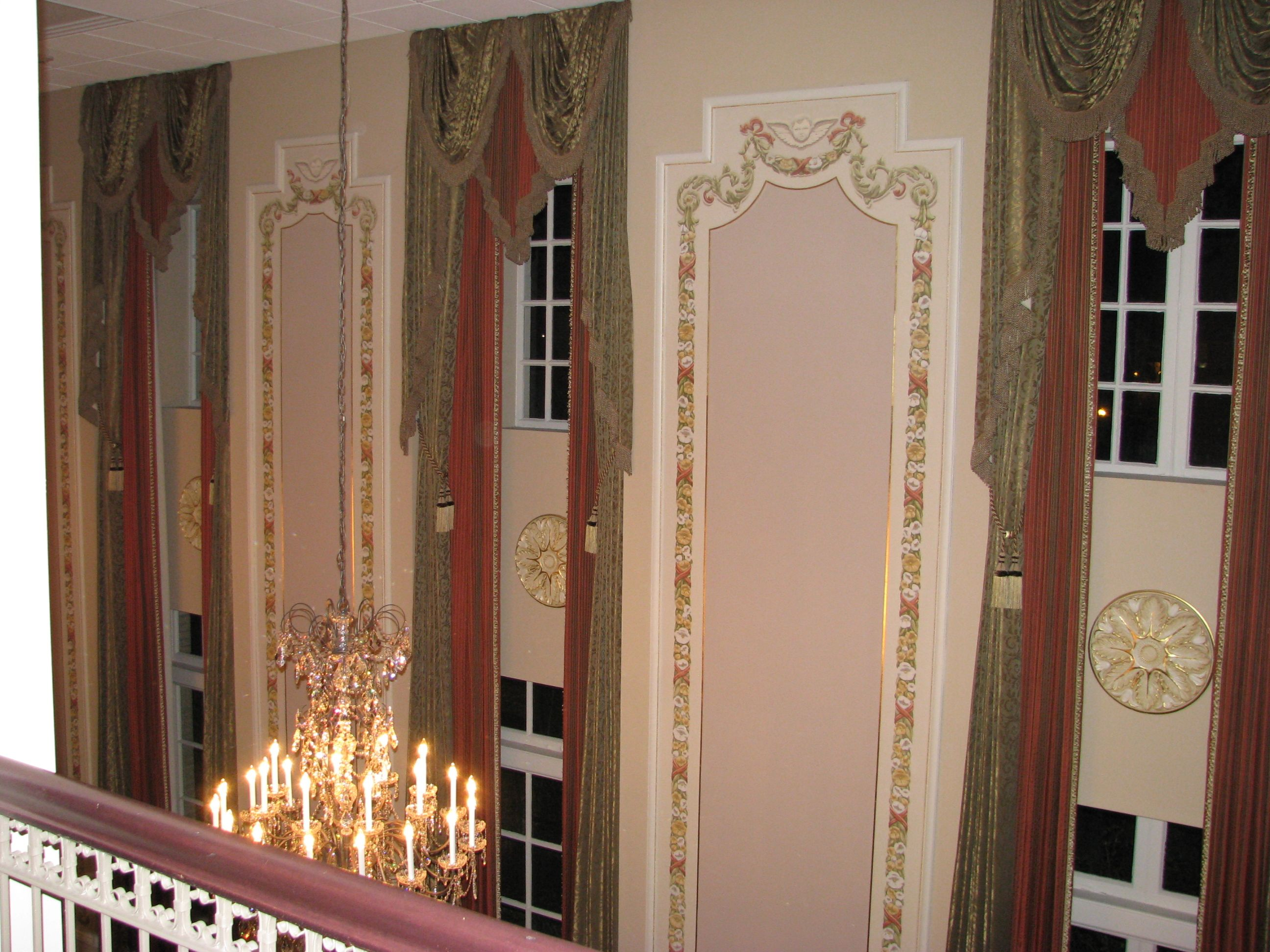
The Lobby

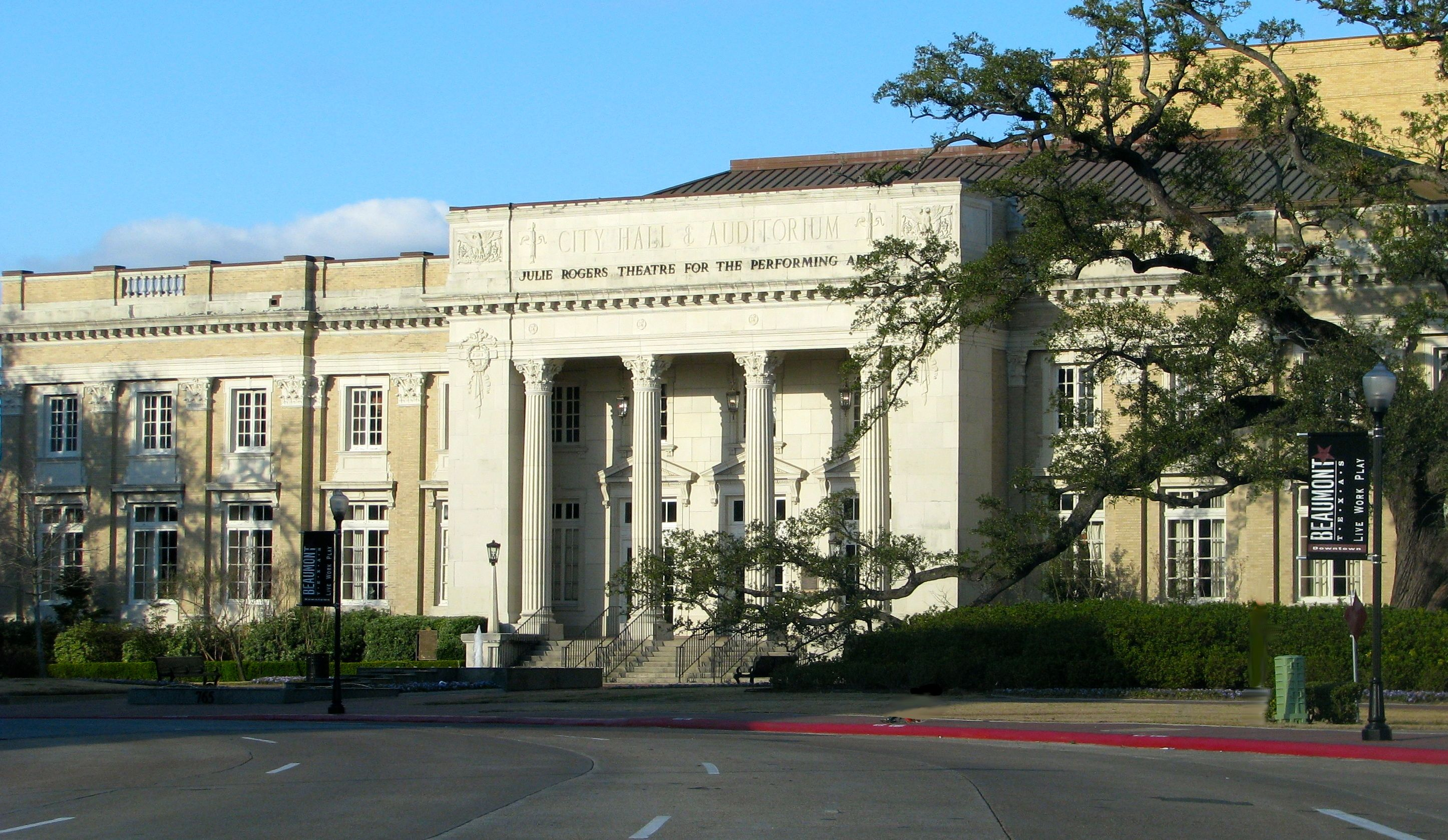
From Pearl Street

== See also ==
- National Register of Historic Places listings in Jefferson County, Texas
- Jefferson Theatre Beaumont, Texas
