= Miller Symphony Hall =

Performing arts facility

Coordinates: 40.603753°N 75.46971°W

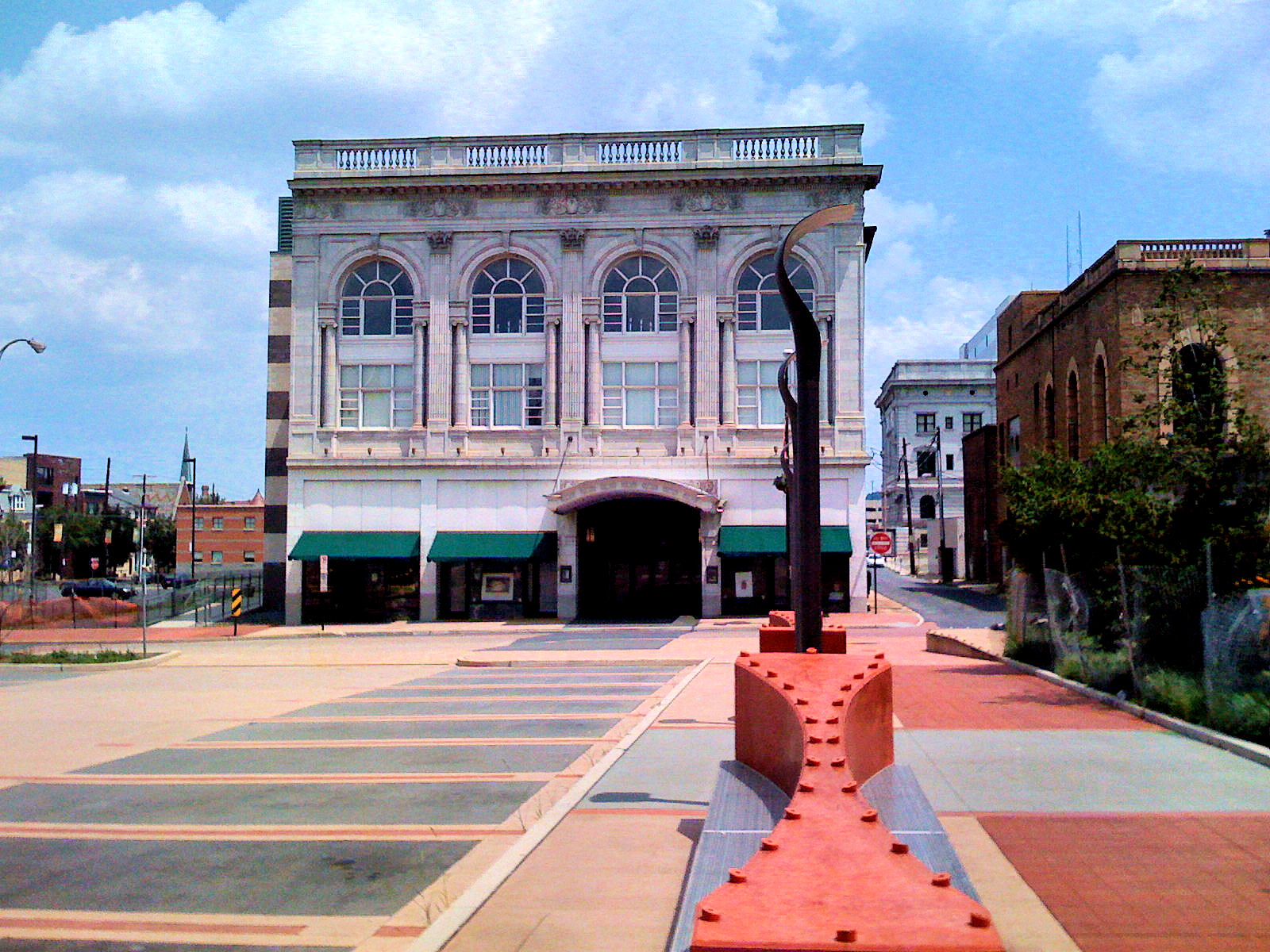
- Miller Symphony Hall in July 2008
- Interactive map of Miller Symphony Hall
- Former names: Central Market, Lyric Theatre, Allentown Symphony Hall
- Location: 23 North 6th Street; Allentown, Pennsylvania; U.S.
- Owner: Allentown Symphony Orchestra
- Capacity: 1,100
- Type: Concert hall

Construction
- Built: 1896–1899

Website
- www.millersymphonyhall.com

Miller Symphony Hall is a 1,100-seat performing arts facility in Allentown, Pennsylvania that hosts the Allentown Symphony Orchestra. The hall was previously known as Central Market (1896), Lyric Theater (1899), and Allentown Symphony Hall (1959). In 2012, it was renamed for the Miller family, longtime owners of the hall and The Morning Call newspaper.

== Allentown Symphony Association ==
The Mission of the Allentown Symphony Association is "to provide a first-class symphony orchestra and hall, quality performing arts, and cultural education in partnership with the community."

The theater maintains a full production schedule of non-orchestral performances, including the new Symphony Hall Pops Series, Jazz Cabaret Series, Backstage Chamber Series, Musical Treasure Chest series for small children and their families, and a variety of Special Events.

In addition to the Allentown Symphony Orchestra, Miller Symphony Hall also serves as home to the Allentown Band, the Allentown Symphony Chorus, and Repertory Dance Theatre's annual Nutcracker Ballet.

== History ==
=== Origins ===
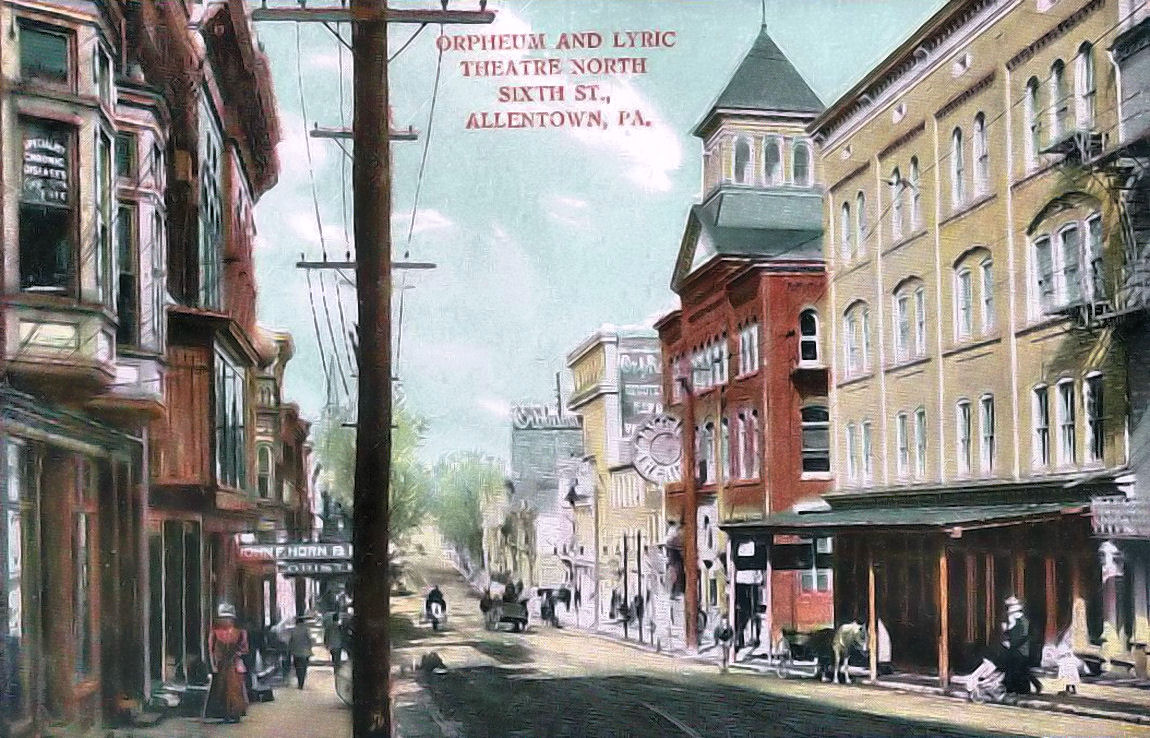
The Lyric and Orpehum Theaters in the first decade of the 1900s

Miller Symphony Hall is the oldest live performance theater in Allentown, its heritage dating to 1817 when Northampton Town got its first farmer's market on Center Square. It was a wood and stone building. In 1848, that building was consumed by fire when most of the Allentown Central Business District burned. It was rebuilt in 1859 at the corner of Church Street and Linden. In 1896, a new Central Market was built at the northeast corner of Sixth and Court Streets. However, it was not an economic success.

Shortly after its opening, the market began to host concerts and in 1899, the firm of J.B. McElfatrick converted the structure to a theater. The name, Lyric Theater, came about through a contest, with a five dollar gold piece as prize for the best submission. It also served to replace the former Academy of Music at North Sixth and Linden Street, which burned down in 1901.

=== Lyric Theater ===
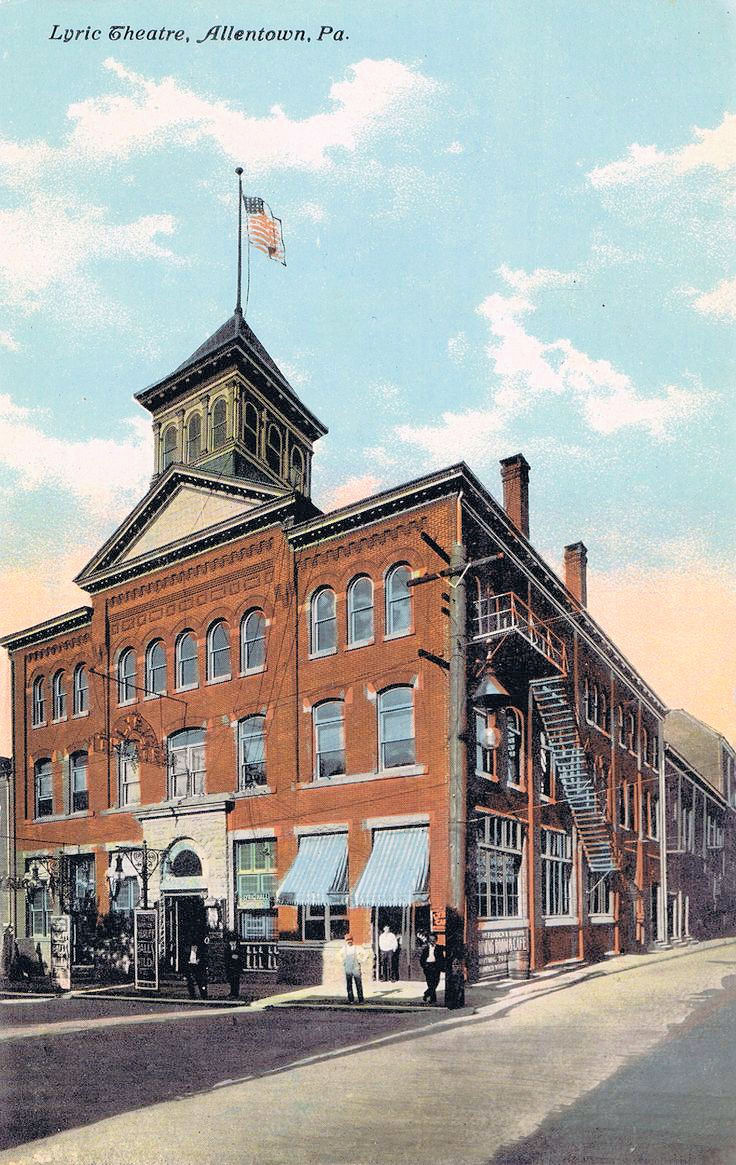
The Lyric Theater in the 1910s

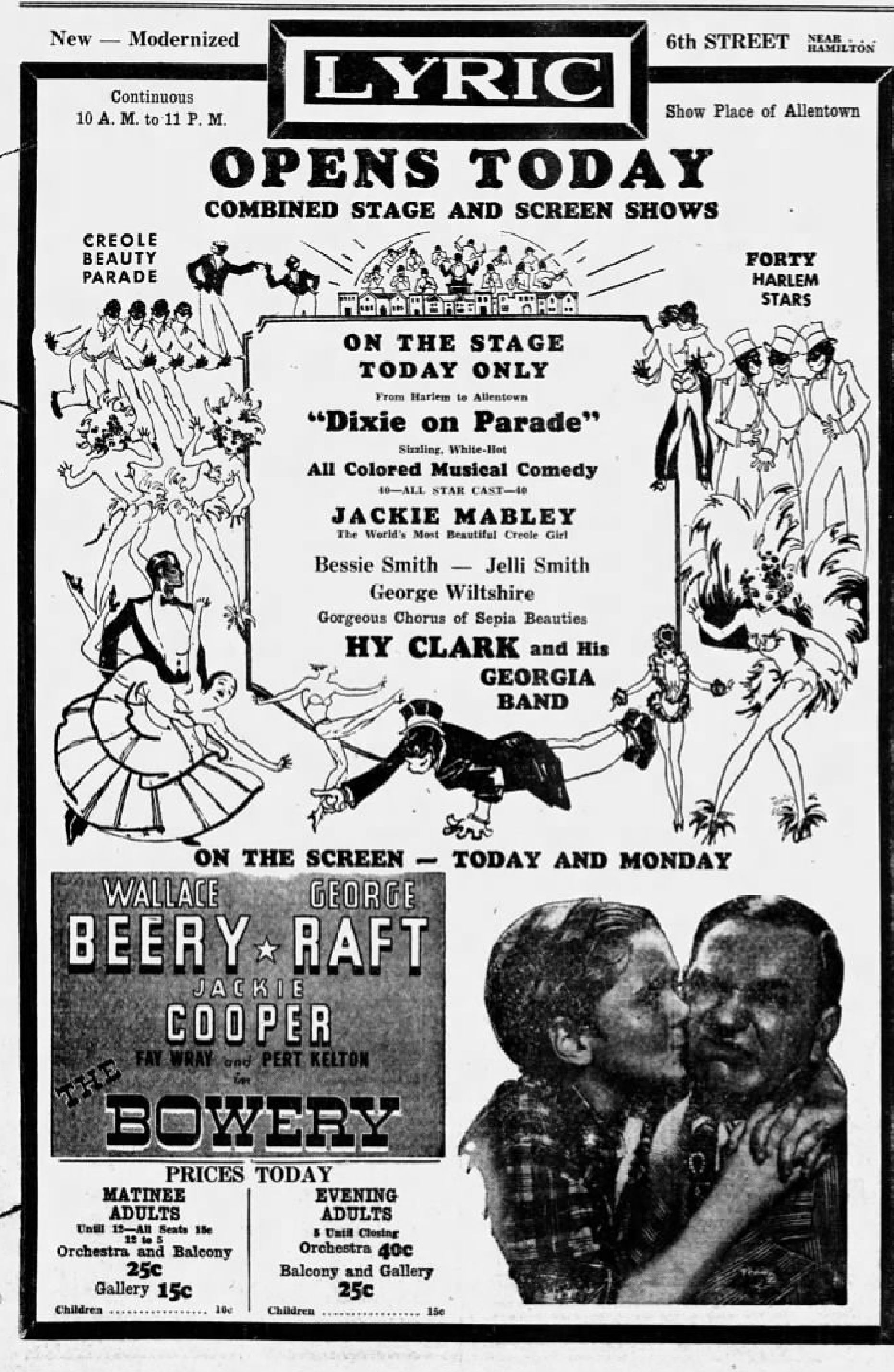
A poster promoting the 1933 film The Bowery and live performers, including Jackie "Moms" Mabley at the Lyric

The Lyric opened with a comic opera production based on the life of 18th century Prussian King Frederick the Great. The theater offered vaudeville, operas, plays, dramatic skits, minstrel shows, films and concerts, and also became one of the leading burlesque halls in the United States. On December 1, 1910, French actress Sarah Bernhardt made a one-night appearance at the Lyric. In 1912, it was the site of speeches by Theodore Roosevelt, Woodrow Wilson and Booker T. Washington. Close to the Lyric at 35 North Sixth was the Orpheum Theater, which opened in 1906. While the Lyric presented primarily stage plays, the Orpheum was the first major vaudeville theater in Allentown. It presented variety shows that mixed jugglers, song-and-dance teams, acrobats, comedians with other performers.

During World War I, Allentown was the home of a large U.S. Army training camp, Camp Crane, where thousands of recruits were indoctrinated into the military as ambulance drivers before being sent overseas to France. The Lyric, although primarily a stage theater, was adapted to show silent films to entertain the troops that came into the city for recreation. Oliver "Ollie" Gernert, the treasurer of the Lyric, took note that when the Lyric showed a movie, it was packed with soldiers, but when it presented a stage play, many seats were empty. Gernert believed that a cinema-only theater would be extremely profitable, and if it were owned by someone who worked for the Lyric, there would be no conflict of interest as the Lyric could continue to present stage shows. The Orpheum Theater, located next to the Lyric at Sixth and Linden, was primarily a vaudeville theater. It was decided to construct a new cinema-only theater and return the Lyric to a stage theater only. The cinema, known as "The Strand" was erected during the summer of 1917 on North Eighth Street, and it opened to a full auditorium on 8 October of that year.

By the early 1920s, the Orpheum Theater was converted into a cinema known as the State Theater, and most Vaudeville acts that performed there began to perform at the Lyric. The building was renovated and sported a new neo-classical facade, designed by Allentown's first Jewish architect, David Levy, and had become one of the nation's leading "tryout" theaters, a place where new stage shows appeared before being taken to Broadway. The Marx Brothers debuted the musical revue I'll Say She Is at the Lyric in 1923. The show would play a long run in Philadelphia, and become a hit on Broadway. In 1926 the Lyric stepped briefly into an international spotlight when it became the first theater in America to show Ashes of Love, a play written by a titled English lady, Vera Countess of Cathcart, whose scandalous divorce led to her briefly being kept out of the U.S. on grounds of "moral turpitude."

With the advent of the Great Depression, the theater's fortunes seriously declined. The number of new plays on the traveling theater tryout circuit dropped dramatically and the theater was unable to operate full-time. Empty seats in the theater and an increasing number of nights without a show to present forced theater managers to book other forms of entertainment. As a result, Boxing matches and appearances by marginal entertainers such as Busty Russell and Ding Dong Bell, whose names suggested their talents were more physical than strictly theatrical, were considered the only types of acts the venue merited. Prize fights and burlesque strip shows may not have been the most decorous forms of entertainment, but they "filled the hall," as the saying went, and paid the rent. However, by the end of World War II, it seemed that the Lyric Theater had its best days behind it.

In the late 1940s, the Lyric became the home of the Allentown Symphony Orchestra and the Allentown Community Concert Association. About 4,000 to 5,000 local concertgoers attended concerts at the Lyric from 1945 to 1952. In addition to the Symphony concerts, burlesque shows kept bringing in the crowds. The Philadelphia Inquirer Magazine profiled this seemingly incongruous relationship. "There they have burlesque every Saturday night—in Symphony Hall. … It's doubtless the only symphony in the country that is partly supported by burlesque."

=== Allentown Symphony Hall ===
The venue's logo

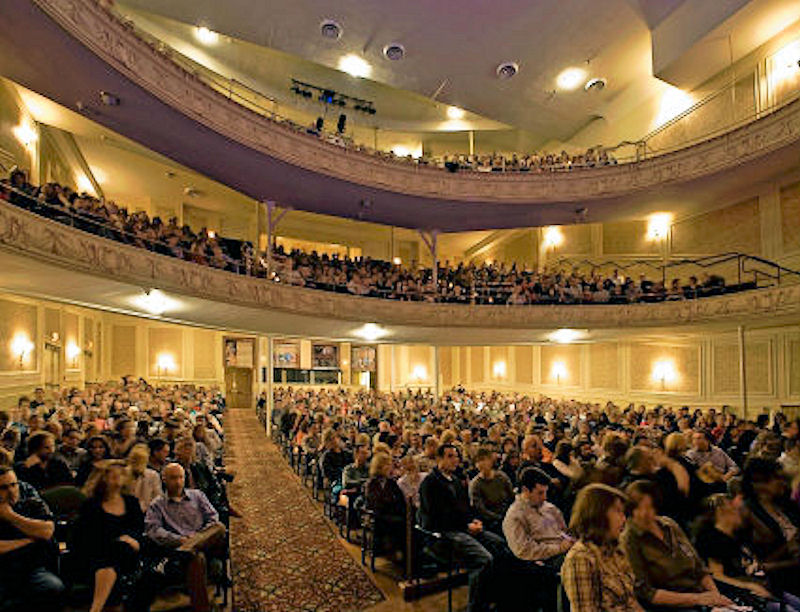
Miller Symphony Hall Auditorium in January 2016

However, by the late 1950s, the Lyric was losing money and its owners, I. Hirst Enterprises, Inc. planned to close the theater and sell the property. Park & Shop Enterprises, an Allentown Parking lot firm which had purchased the adjacent State (formerly the Orpheum) theater in 1953 and demolished it, converting the land into parking space for shoppers going to the Retail District of Allentown on Hamilton Street. Seeing the Lyric for sale, they approached Hirst Enterprises to buy the Lyric. However, just before the sale to Park & Shop completed, Donald and Sam Miller, the owners of The Morning Call, offered to buy the theater from Hirst Enterprises. The Millers proposed a plan on June 2, 1959, to the Allentown Symphony Association to purchase the building for the orchestra as a dedicated concert hall. They secured financing with the First National Bank of Allentown for the purchase which they completed on July 14, 1959. Later, the building was renamed Allentown Symphony Hall.

Although the burlesque shows at the Lyric continued until 1975, Allentown Symphony Hall became primarily a venue for classical music concerts and stage play productions. It is also used by the Allentown School District for its classical music students and for other events such as ballet and jazz shows.

In 1987, the symphony association, stuck with a deteriorating building and a hefty debt, set a course for the restoration of the one-time burlesque house by undertaking its own fund-raising program and forgoing an offer to sell the building. A fund-raising effort resulted in the Allentown Symphony Association raising $10 million from public and private sources to improve the hall. Restoration and renovation at Symphony Hall began in 1991 and in 2006, the renovation project repaired the exterior and roof, upgraded patron seating and lobby areas, created rehearsal, office and reception spaces, and added an entire wing with new lobby, teaching and dressing room spaces. In addition, the renovation project completed an upgrade of the Symphony Hall stage and constructed a new acoustical shell. A second phase of renovations, funded as part of its $6 million 60th anniversary fundraising campaign held in 2011 replaced and reinforced the main stage floor and added doors between the inner lobby and the auditorium. Ongoing renovations will replace seating on the third-level balcony and improve and modernize the backstage area and lighting.

=== Miller Symphony Hall ===
In recognition and appreciation for the Miller family on November 10, 2012, the Board of the Allentown Symphony Association changed the name to Miller Symphony Hall.
