= Symphony of Southeast Texas =

- Orchestra
- Former name: Beaumont Symphony Orchestra
- Founded: May 12, 1953
- Location: Beaumont, Texas, U.S.
- Concert hall: Julie Rogers Theater
- Music director: Chelsea Tipton, II
- Website: www.sost.org

The Symphony of Southeast Texas is an American orchestra based in Beaumont, Texas. The orchestra, formerly known as the Beaumont Symphony Orchestra, officially started in 1953; however, the impetus can be traced back as early as 1923 with the formation of the Beaumont Music Commission. The 2019-20 season is the sixty-seventh consecutive season since the founding year. The symphony's home theater is the Julie Rogers Theater in downtown Beaumont. The symphony lists over eighty musicians in the orchestra as of 2015.

The typical season includes four classical concerts and two pops concerts. A separate Holiday concert is offered. In addition, the symphony makes several free appearances. A typical season includes four youth concerts, two "side–by–side" concerts, and a concert included in the city of Beaumont's annual July 4th celebration in downtown Beaumont. Student and professional musicians perform together in the side–by–side concerts.

The symphony is supported by the Symphony League of Beaumont, formerly known as the Beaumont Symphony Women's League. The league was organized in 1955. It provides financial support as well as services. Other support is provided by corporate and foundation underwriting as well as concert admission fees.

== History ==
Several well known and popular artists have performed with the symphony over the years. Examples of some of the performers include Al Hirt, Andre Previn, Van Cliburn, and Isaac Stern.

The symphony has been led by several conductors over its history.

- Jay Dietzer (1953–1957)
- de:Edvard Fendler (1953–1970)
- Joseph B. Carlucci (1971–1990)
- Diane M. Wittry (1990–2000)
- Christopher Zimmerman (2000–2007)
- Chelsea Tipton, II (2007–present)
