= Sarah Edmiston =

Australian Paralympic athlete (born 1975)

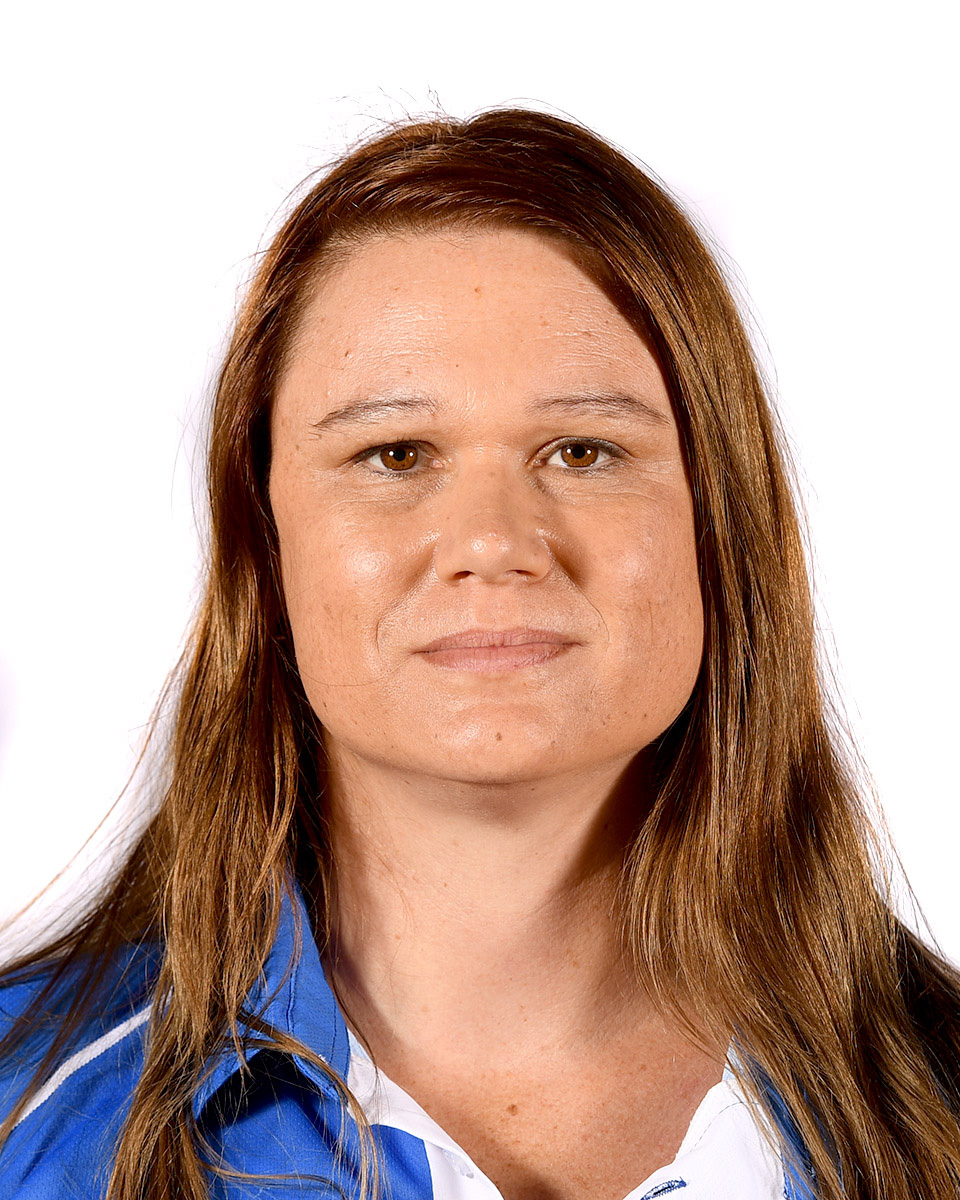
- Sarah Edmiston in 2019

Personal information
- Full name: Sarah Edmiston
- Nationality: Australian
- Born: 8 September 1975 (age 51) Lower Hutt, New Zealand

Sport
- Country: Australia
- Sport: Athletics
- Events: Discus, Shot Put
- Coached by: Paul Edmiston
Medal record
Track and field
Summer Paralympics
Bronze medal – third place	2020 Tokyo	Women's Discus F64
World Para Athletics Championships
Silver medal – second place	2019 Dubai	Women's Discus F44
Bronze medal – third place	2017 London	Women's Discus F44
Commonwealth Games
Silver medal – second place	2022 Birmingham	Women's Discus F44/64

Sarah Edmiston (born 8 September 1975) is an Australian Paralympic athlete who specialises in the discus and shot put. At her first major international competition, she won the bronze medal in the Women's Discus F44 at the 2017 World Para Athletics Championships and followed this up with a silver medal in the same event at the 2019 World Para Athletics Championships. She also won the bronze medal in the Women's Discus F64 at the 2020 Tokyo Paralympics and competed at the 2024 Paris Paralympics.

== Personal ==
Edmiston was born on 8 September 1975 in Lower Hutt, New Zealand. In 2017, she moved to Perth, Western Australia. She is married to former Australian hurdler Paul Edmiston and they have four children.

== Athletics ==
Edmiston started athletics with Bungaree Little Athletics Club. At the age of 19, a water skiing accident put a halt to her athletics career. She recommenced throwing again at the age of 25 but was only classified after the 2016 Rio Paralympics. She is classified as a F44. She is coached by her husband Paul Edmiston and is a member of the Perth Track and Field Club. At her first major international competition, she won the bronze medal in the Women's Discus F44 at the 2017 World Para Athletics Championships in London, England with a throw of 33.80m. In addition, she finished seventh in the Women's Shot Put F44 with a throw of 8.04m.

In 2016, Edmiston was awarded a Western Australian Institute of Sport athletics scholarship. At the 2019 World Para Athletics Championships in Dubai, she won the silver medal in the Women's Discus F44 with a throw of 36.43m.

Edmiston competed at the 2020 Summer Paralympics in Tokyo, winning the bronze medal in the Women's Discus F64 with an Oceania record throw of 37.85m.

At the 2022 Commonwealth Games, she won the silver medal in the Women's Discus F42-44/61-64. Edmiston at the 2023 World Para Athletics Championships in Paris threw 35.11m to finish in fourth place of the Women's Discus F64.

At the 2024 Paris Paralympics, she finished seventh in the Women's Discus throw F44.
