= Sylvia Olero =

Kenyan Paralympic athlete

Personal information
- Full name: Sylvia Atieno Olero
- Nationality: Kenyan
- Born: October 6, 1979 (age 46)

Sport
- Country: Kenya
- Sport: Athletics
- Event: Discus

Sylvia Atieno Olero is a Kenyan athlete who specialises in the discus. She got the seventh-place position in the Women's Discus F42 at the 2022 Commonwealth Games, setting a new personal record of 26.35m.

Olero also featured in the 2017 World Para Athletics Championship in London and the Dubai 2019 World Para Athletics Championships representing Kenya.
