= Goodness Nwachukwu =

Nigerian Paralympic athlete

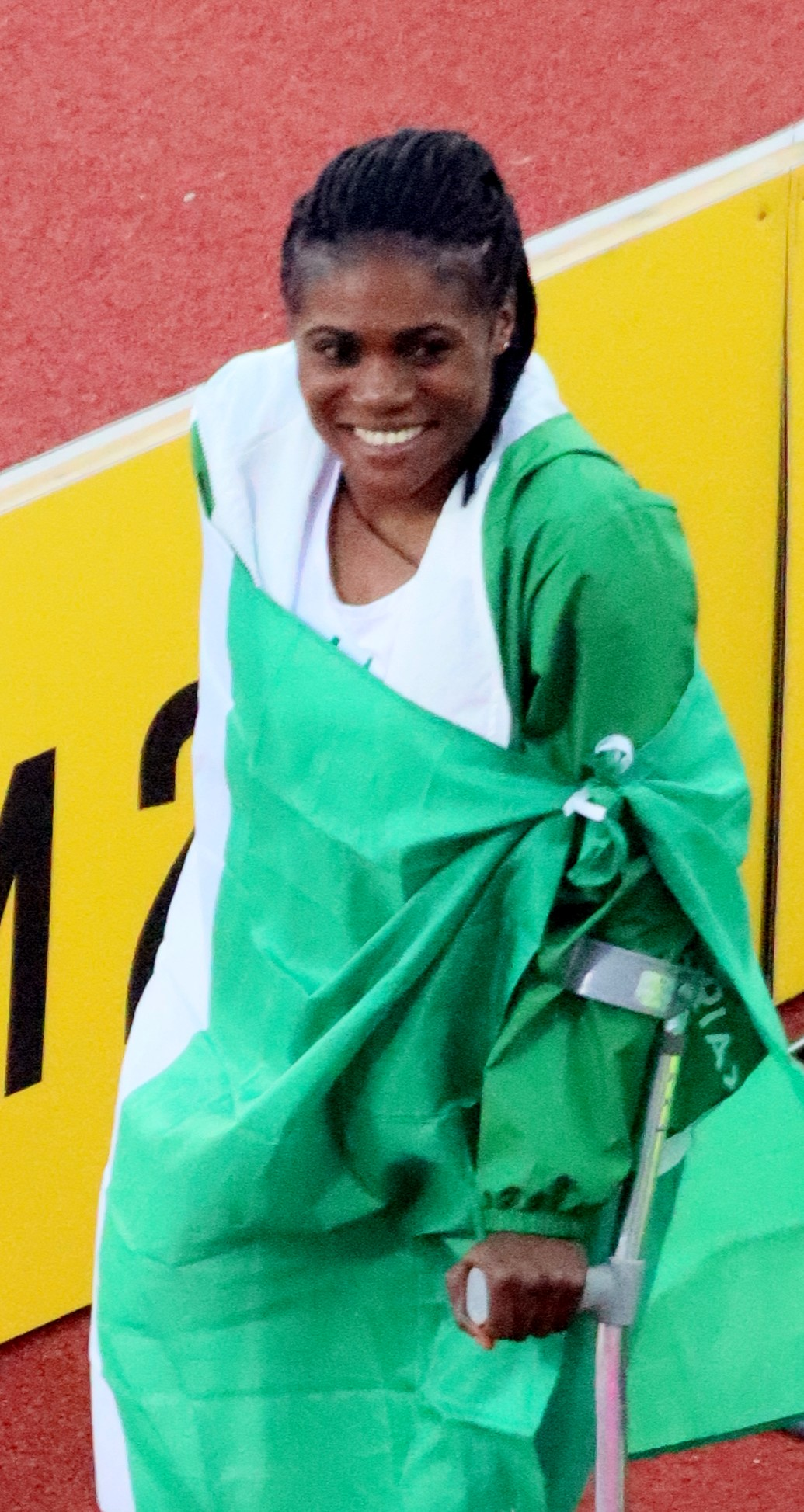
- Nwachukwu at the 2022 Commonwealth Games

Personal information
- Full name: Goodness Chiemerie Nwachukwu
- Nationality: Nigerian
- Born: 6 October 1998 (age 27)

Sport
- Country: Nigeria
- Sport: Para-athletics
- Events: Discus; Shot put
Medal record
Women's para-athletics
Representing Nigeria
World Championships
Silver medal – second place	2023 Paris	Shot put F64
Commonwealth Games
Gold medal – first place	2022 Birmingham	Discus throw F42
WPA Grand Prix
Gold medal – first place	2021 Tunis WPA Grand Prix	Discus Throw F44/46

Goodness Chiemerie Nwachukwu (born 6 October 1998) is a Nigerian athlete who specializes in the Discus throw. She is the current and previous Commonwealth Games champion in the Women's Discus F42, as well as the current world record holder in the event. It is her fourth consecutive world record.

In addition to her accomplishments in Discus throws, Nwachukwu has also competed in the Shot put. She won a Silver medal in the Women's Shot put F64, at the 2023 World Para Athletics Championships in Paris.

== Career ==
She won the gold medal in the Women's Discus F42 at the 2022 Commonwealth Games, setting a new world record for the discipline of 36.56m. She broke her own world record of 32.95m, previously set at the 2021 World Para Athletics Grand Prix in Tunis.

At the 2026 Commonwealth Games in Glasgow, Nwachukwu set a new world record of 39.66m in the Women's Discus F42 event, breaking her previous record from the 2022 Games by a margin of 3.1m, and securing a Gold medal for Nigeria.
