= Julie Rogers (Paralympian) =

British volleyball player

Personal information
- Citizenship: British
- Born: Julie Ming-Jue Rogers; 2 November 1998 (age 27) Bedford, Bedfordshire, Great Britain

Sport
- Country: Great Britain
- Sport: Sitting volleyball, Athletics
- Disability: Limb deficiency
- Disability class: T42
- Club: Bedford and County Athletics Club
- Coached by: Paula Dunn (national); Allen Adamson (personal)

Achievements and titles
- Paralympic finals: 2012 (volleyball)

Julie Ming-Jue Rogers (born 2 November 1998) was one of the youngest participants in the 2012 Summer Paralympics representing Great Britain in the sitting volleyball team. In the buildup to the 2016 Summer Paralympics Rogers switched sports to track and field athletics, competing as a T42 classification sprinter.

== Sports career ==
When Rogers participated in the 2012 Summer Paralympics she was still a student at Bedford Modern School and some 26 years junior to her fellow team member, Martine Wright. Since her participation in the 2012 Summer Paralympics, Rogers has changed her attention to athletics where she has become one of the fastest female Paralympic sprinters in the UK. In 2014, Rogers' fastest time as a sprinter was 5th in the world rankings for that year.
