= Bosnia and Herzegovina at the 2024 Summer Paralympics =

- Flag of Bosnia and Herzegovina
- IPC code: BIH
- NPC: Paralympic Committee of Bosnia and Herzegovina

in Paris, France August 28, 2024 – September 8, 2024
- Competitors: 14 (14 men) in 3 sports
- Flag bearer: Safet Alibašić
- Medals Ranked 70th: Gold 0 Silver 2 Bronze 0 Total 2

Summer Paralympics appearances (overview)
- 1996; 2000; 2004; 2008; 2012; 2016; 2020; 2024

Other related appearances
- Yugoslavia (1972–2000)

Bosnia and Herzegovina competed at the 2024 Summer Paralympics in Paris, France, from 28 August to 8 September 2024.

== Medalists ==
| Medal | Name | Sport | Event | Date |
|---|---|---|---|---|
| Silver | Ismail Barlov | Swimming | Men's 50 metre breaststroke SB2 | 4 September |
| Silver | Bosnia and Herzegovina national sitting volleyball team: Safet Alibašić; Nizam Čančar; Stevan Crnobrnja; Sabahudin Delalić; Edin Dino; Mirzet Duran; Ismet Godinjak; Dževad Hamzić; Ermin Jusufović; Adnan Manko; Asim Medić; Armin Šehić | Sitting volleyball | Men's tournament | 6 September |

Medals by sport
| Sport | 1st place, gold medalist(s) | 2nd place, silver medalist(s) | 3rd place, bronze medalist(s) | Total |
| Volleyball | 0 | 1 | 0 | 1 |
| Swimming | 0 | 1 | 0 | 1 |
| Total | 0 | 2 | 0 | 2 |

Medals by day
| Date | 1st place, gold medalist(s) | 2nd place, silver medalist(s) | 3rd place, bronze medalist(s) | Total |
| 4 September | 0 | 1 | 0 | 1 |
| 6 September | 0 | 1 | 0 | 1 |
| Total | 0 | 2 | 0 | 2 |

Medals by gender
| Gender | 1st place, gold medalist(s) | 2nd place, silver medalist(s) | 3rd place, bronze medalist(s) | Total |
| Female | 0 | 0 | 0 | 0 |
| Male | 0 | 2 | 0 | 2 |
| Total | 0 | 2 | 0 | 2 |

== Competitors ==
| Sport | Men | Women | Total |
|---|---|---|---|
| Sitting volleyball | 12 | 0 | 12 |
| Shooting | 1 | 0 | 1 |
| Swimming | 1 | 0 | 1 |
| Total | 14 | 0 | 14 |

== Sitting volleyball ==
Bosnia and Herzegovina men's sitting volleyball team qualified for the Paralympic games by virtue of the highest eligible rank nation's at the 2023 Sitting Volleyball European Championships held in Caorle, Italy.

Roster

- Safet Alibašić
- Nizam Čančar
- Stevan Crnobrnja
- Sabahudin Delalić
- Edin Dino
- Mirzet Duran
- Ismet Godinjak
- Dževad Hamzić
- Ermin Jusufović
- Adnan Manko
- Asim Medić
- Armin Šehić

Summary

| Team | Event | Group stage | | | | Semifinal | Final / BM / Cl. | |
| Team | Event | Opposition Score | Opposition Score | Opposition Score | Rank | Opposition Score | Opposition Score | Rank |
|---|---|---|---|---|---|---|---|---|
| Bosnia and Herzegovina men's team | Men's tournament | Egypt; W 3–1 | Kazakhstan; W 3–2 | France; W 3–0 | 1 Q | Germany; W 3–0 | Iran; L 1–3 | 2nd place, silver medalist(s) |

== Shooting ==
| Athlete | Event | Qualification | | Final | |
| Athlete | Event | Points | Rank | Points | Rank |
|---|---|---|---|---|---|
| Ervin Bejdić | P1 Men's 10 metre air pistol SH1 | 536-7x | 25 | Did not advance | |
| Ervin Bejdić | P3 Mixed 25 metre pistol SH1 | 531-5x | 25 | Did not advance | |
| Ervin Bejdić | P4 Mixed 50 metre pistol SH1 | 493-2x | 29 | Did not advance | |

== Swimming ==
| Athlete | Event | Heats | | Final | |
| Athlete | Event | Result | Rank | Result | Rank |
|---|---|---|---|---|---|
| Ismail Barlov | Men's 50 m breaststroke SB2 | 1:04.06 | 3 Q | 1:02.74 | 2nd place, silver medalist(s) |
| Ismail Barlov | Men's 150 metre individual medley SM3 | 3:34.84 | 10 | Did not advance | |
