= Bosnia and Herzegovina at the 2020 Summer Paralympics =

- Flag of Bosnia and Herzegovina
- IPC code: BIH
- NPC: Paralympic Committee of Bosnia and Herzegovina

in Tokyo, Japan August 24, 2021 – September 5, 2021
- Competitors: 16 in 4 sports
- Medals Ranked 78th: Gold 0 Silver 0 Bronze 1 Total 1

Summer Paralympics appearances (overview)
- 1996; 2000; 2004; 2008; 2012; 2016; 2020; 2024

Other related appearances
- Yugoslavia (1972–2000)

Bosnia and Herzegovina competed at the 2020 Summer Paralympics in Tokyo, Japan, from 24 August to 5 September 2021. This was their seventh consecutive appearance at the Summer Paralympics since 1996.

== Medalists ==
Medal	Name	Sport	Event	Date
Bronze	Bosnia & Herzegovina men's national sitting volleyball team: Ismet Godinjak; Adnan Manko; Stevan Crnobrnja; Asim Medić; Mirzet Duran; Nizam Čančar; Dževad Hamzić; Jasmin Brkić; Safet Alibašić; Sabahudin Delalić; Ermin Jusufović	Sitting volleyball	Men's tournament	4 September

== Athletics ==
Number	Athlete	Event	Rank
Men's Track
1	Dževad Pandžić	Men's shot put F55	7

== Shooting ==
Bosnia and Herzegovina entered two athletes into the Paralympic competition. Ervin Bejdic & Zerina Skomorac successfully break the Paralympic qualification at the 2019 WSPS World Championships which was held in Sydney, Australia.

Athlete	Event	Qualification		Final	
Athlete	Event	Score	Rank	Score	Rank
Ervin Bejdic	10 m air pistol standing SH1	539	26	Did Not Advance	
Ervin Bejdic	50 m pistol SH1	507	28	Did Not Advance	
Zerina Skomorac	Mixed R5 – 10 m air rifle prone SH2	629.9	28	Did Not Advance	

== Sitting volleyball ==
The men's sitting volleyball team qualified for the 2020 Summer Paralympics after winning the silver medal at the 2018 World ParaVolley Championships.

Pos	Team	Pld	W	L	Pts	SW	SL	SR	SPW	SPL	SPR	Qualification
1	RPC (RPC)	3	3	0	3	9	0	MAX	225	151	1.490	Semifinals
2	Bosnia and Herzegovina	3	2	1	2	6	3	2.000	205	176	1.165	Semifinals
3	Egypt	3	1	2	1	3	6	0.500	193	174	1.109	Fifth place match
4	Japan	3	0	3	0	0	9	0.000	103	225	0.458	Seventh place match

Source: TOCOG

27 August 2021; 22:00 v	Egypt	0–3	Bosnia and Herzegovina	Makuhari Messe, Tokyo; Referees: Andre Calado (BRA), Neal Konowalyk (CAN)
27 August 2021; 22:00 v	(23–25, 22–25, 15–25); Results Statistics			Makuhari Messe, Tokyo; Referees: Andre Calado (BRA), Neal Konowalyk (CAN)

29 August 2021; 10:00 v	RPC (RPC)	3–0	Bosnia and Herzegovina	Makuhari Messe, Tokyo; Referees: Neal Konowalyk (CAN), Ebrahim Firouzi (IRI)
29 August 2021; 10:00 v	(25–19, 25–18, 25–18); Results Statistics			Makuhari Messe, Tokyo; Referees: Neal Konowalyk (CAN), Ebrahim Firouzi (IRI)

31 August 2021; 20:30 v	Bosnia and Herzegovina	3–0	Japan	Makuhari Messe, Tokyo; Referees: Barbara Pakuła (POL), Kim Jong-heun (KOR)
31 August 2021; 20:30 v	(25–13, 25–15, 25–13); Results Statistics			Makuhari Messe, Tokyo; Referees: Barbara Pakuła (POL), Kim Jong-heun (KOR)

=== Semifinals ===
2 September 2021; 20:30 v	Iran	3–0	Bosnia and Herzegovina	Makuhari Messe, Tokyo; Referees: Dominik Raca (CRO), Andre Calado (BRA)
2 September 2021; 20:30 v	(25–16, 25–16, 25–17); Results Statistics			Makuhari Messe, Tokyo; Referees: Dominik Raca (CRO), Andre Calado (BRA)

=== Bronze medal match ===
4 September 2021; 14:00 v	Brazil	1–3	Bosnia and Herzegovina (bronze)	Makuhari Messe, Tokyo; Referees: Neal Konowalyk (CAN), Sari Mannersuo (FIN)
4 September 2021; 14:00 v	(25–23, 19–25, 18–25, 11–25); Results Statistics			Makuhari Messe, Tokyo; Referees: Neal Konowalyk (CAN), Sari Mannersuo (FIN)

== Table tennis ==
Athlete	Event	Group Stage			Round 1	Quarterfinals	Semifinals	Final	
Athlete	Event	Opposition Result	Opposition Result	Rank	Opposition Result	Opposition Result	Opposition Result	Opposition Result	Rank
Haris Eminovic	Individual C6	Thainiyom (THA); L 0–3	Rau (GER); L 0–3	3	Did Not Advance				

== See also ==
- Bosnia and Herzegovina at the Paralympics
- Bosnia and Herzegovina at the 2020 Summer Olympics
