= Bosnia and Herzegovina at the 2016 Summer Paralympics =

- IPC code: BIH
- NPC: Paralympic Committee of Bosnia and Herzegovina
- Website: www.pkbih.com

in Rio de Janeiro
- Competitors: 14 in 2 sports
- Flag bearer: Dženita Klico
- Medals Ranked 69th: Gold 0 Silver 1 Bronze 0 Total 1

Summer Paralympics appearances (overview)
- 1996; 2000; 2004; 2008; 2012; 2016; 2020; 2024

Other related appearances
- Yugoslavia (1972–2000)

Bosnia and Herzegovina competed at the 2016 Summer Paralympics in Rio de Janeiro, Brazil, from 7 to 18 September 2016.

== Disability classifications ==
Every participant at the Paralympics has their disability grouped into one of five disability categories; amputation, the condition may be congenital or sustained through injury or illness; cerebral palsy; wheelchair athletes, there is often overlap between this and other categories; visual impairment, including blindness; Les autres, any physical disability that does not fall strictly under one of the other categories, for example dwarfism or multiple sclerosis. Each Paralympic sport then has its own classifications, dependent upon the specific physical demands of competition. Events are given a code, made of numbers and letters, describing the type of event and classification of the athletes competing. Some sports, such as athletics, divide athletes by both the category and severity of their disabilities, other sports, for example swimming, group competitors from different categories together, the only separation being based on the severity of the disability.

== Delegation ==
The country sent a team of 14 athletes, both 13 men and 1 women, along with 4 officials to the 2016 Summer Paralympics. They competed in two sports, sitting volleyball and athletics.

== Medalists ==
Medal	Name	Sport	Event	Date
Silver	Bosnia and Herzegovina men's national sitting volleyball team: Adnan Kesmer; Adnan Manko; Armin Sehic; Asim Medic; Benis Kadric; Dzevad Hamzic; Ermin Jusufovic; Ismet Godinjak; Mirzet Duran; Nizam Čančar; Sabahudin Delalic; Safet Alibasic	Sitting volleyball	Men	18 September

== Athletics ==
Men
Field events

Athlete	Event	Final	
Athlete	Event	Distance	Position
Dževad Pandžić	Shot put F55	10.09	9

Women
Field events

Athlete	Event	Final	
Athlete	Event	Distance	Position
Dženita Klico	Shot put F54	5.47 PB	7

== Sitting volleyball ==
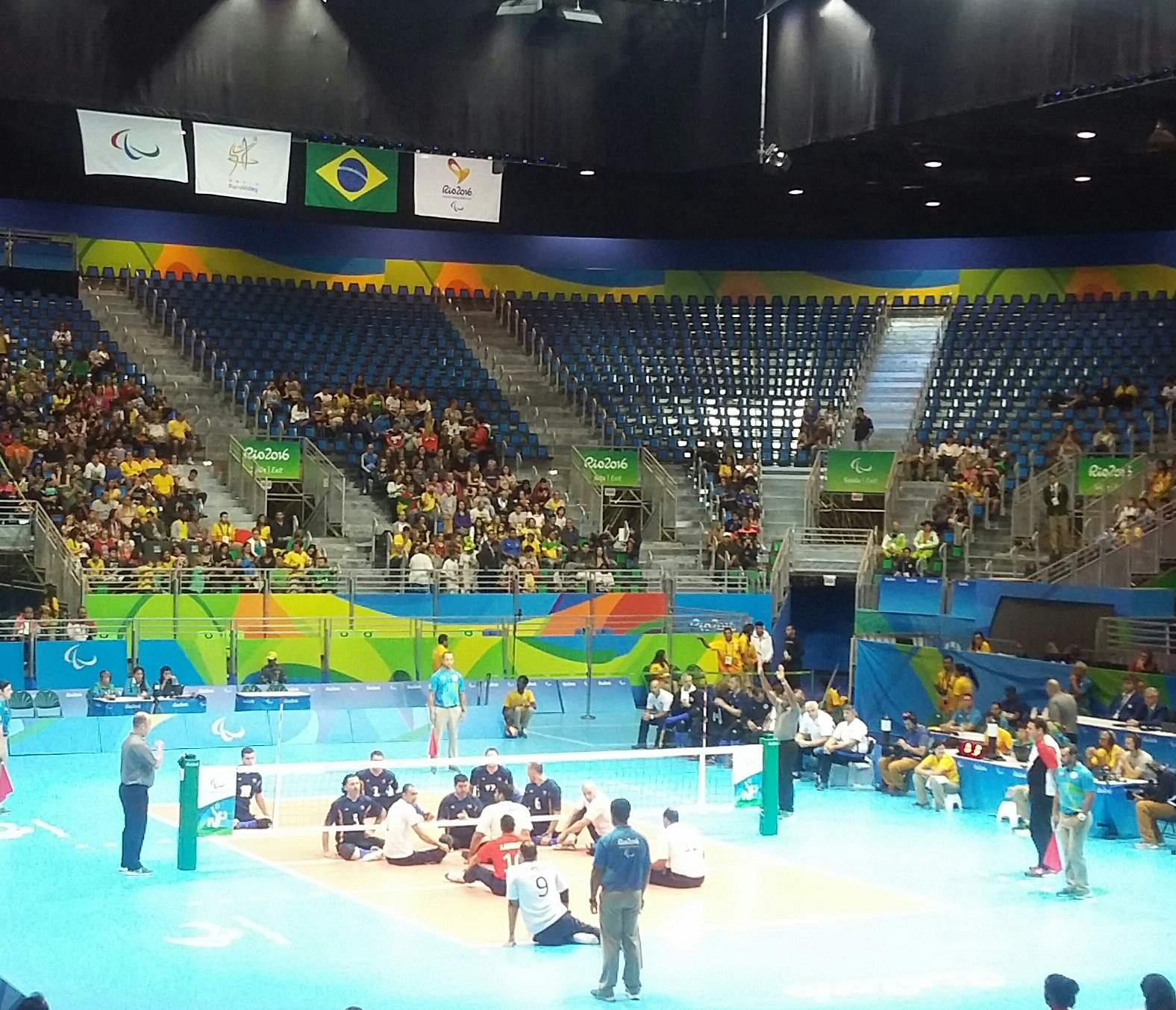
Bosnia and Herzegovina national sitting volleyball team at the 2016 Summer Paralympics

Bosnia and Herzegovina men's national sitting volleyball team qualified for the 2016 Games at the 2014 World Championships.

=== Men ===
==== Group B ====
Pos	Team	Pld	W	L	Pts	SW	SL	SR	SPW	SPL	SPR	Qualification
1	Iran	3	3	0	6	9	0	MAX	228	173	1.318	Semi-finals
2	Bosnia and Herzegovina	3	2	1	5	6	3	2.000	206	184	1.120	Semi-finals
3	Ukraine	3	1	2	4	3	8	0.375	237	265	0.894	Classification 5th / 6th
4	China	3	0	3	3	2	9	0.222	216	265	0.815	Classification 7th / 8th

Source: Paralympic.org

10 September 2016; 20:30	Bosnia and Herzegovina	3–0	Ukraine	Riocentro - Pavilion 6, Rio de Janeiro
10 September 2016; 20:30	(25–12, 25–22, 25–20); Report			Riocentro - Pavilion 6, Rio de Janeiro

12 September 2016; 20:30	Iran	3–0	Bosnia and Herzegovina	Riocentro - Pavilion 6, Rio de Janeiro
12 September 2016; 20:30	(25–17, 25–22, 25–17); Report			Riocentro - Pavilion 6, Rio de Janeiro

14 September 2016; 18:30	Bosnia and Herzegovina	3–0	China	Riocentro - Pavilion 6, Rio de Janeiro
14 September 2016; 18:30	(25–14, 25–22, 25–19); Report			Riocentro - Pavilion 6, Rio de Janeiro

==== Semi-finals ====
16 September 2016; 18:30	Egypt	0–3	Bosnia and Herzegovina	Riocentro - Pavilion 6, Rio de Janeiro
16 September 2016; 18:30	(23–25, 16–25, 20–25); Report			Riocentro - Pavilion 6, Rio de Janeiro

==== Gold medal game ====
18 September 2016; 12:35	Bosnia and Herzegovina	1–3	Iran	Riocentro - Pavilion 6, Rio de Janeiro
18 September 2016; 12:35	(21–25, 25–21, 18–25, 15–25); Report			Riocentro - Pavilion 6, Rio de Janeiro

== See also ==
- Bosnia and Herzegovina at the 2016 Summer Olympics
- Bosnia and Herzegovina national sitting volleyball team
