= Bosnia and Herzegovina at the 2012 Summer Paralympics =

- IPC code: BIH
- NPC: Paralympic Committee of Bosnia and Herzegovina
- Website: www.pkbih.com

in London
- Competitors: 13 in 2 sports
- Medals Ranked 52nd: Gold 1 Silver 0 Bronze 0 Total 1

Summer Paralympics appearances (overview)
- 1996; 2000; 2004; 2008; 2012; 2016; 2020; 2024

Other related appearances
- Yugoslavia (1972–2000)

Bosnia and Herzegovina competed at the 2012 Summer Paralympics in London, United Kingdom, from 29 August to 9 September 2012.

== Medallists ==
| Medal | Name | Sport | Event | Date |
|---|---|---|---|---|
| Gold | Safet Alibašić; Nizam Čančar; Sabahudin Delalić; Mirzet Duran; Ismet Godinjak; Dževad Hamzić; Ermin Jusufović; Benis Kadrić; Adnan Kešmer; Adnan Manko; Asim Medić; Ejub Mehmedović | Volleyball | Men's tournament | 8 September |

== Athletics ==
Women's field events

| Athlete | Event | Distance | Points | Rank |
|---|---|---|---|---|
| Sanela Redžić | Shot put F42-44 | 8.64 | 809 | 4 |

== Volleyball ==
=== Men's tournament ===
Roster

The following is the Bosnian roster in the men's volleyball tournament of the 2012 Summer Paralympics.

Head coach: Mirza Hrustemović

| № | Name | Date of birth | Position | 2012 club |
|---|---|---|---|---|
| 1 | Ismet Godinjak | 17 March 1973 | UN | (Bosnia and Herzegovina) OKI Fantomi |
| 2 | Adnan Manko | 16 January 1977 | UN | (Bosnia and Herzegovina) OKI Fantomi |
| 4 | Adnan Kešmer | 11 October 1986 | L | (Bosnia and Herzegovina) OKI Fantomi |
| 5 | Asim Medić | 3 August 1969 | UN | (Bosnia and Herzegovina) Sdi Spid |
| 6 | Mirzet Duran | 13 October 1986 | UN | (Bosnia and Herzegovina) OKI Fantomi |
| 7 | Nizam Čančar | 17 September 1975 | UN | (Bosnia and Herzegovina) OKI Fantomi |
| 8 | Dževad Hamzić | 4 September 1968 | UN | (Bosnia and Herzegovina) Sdi Spid |
| 9 | Benis Kadrić | 28 January 1987 | UN | (Bosnia and Herzegovina) OKI Fantomi |
| 10 | Safet Alibašić | 21 December 1982 | UN | (Bosnia and Herzegovina) Sdi Spid |
| 11 | Sabahudin Delalić | 17 August 1972 | UN | (Bosnia and Herzegovina) Sdi Spid |
| 12 | Ermin Jusufović | 31 May 1981 | M | (Bosnia and Herzegovina) SKISO "Sinovi Bosne" |

Group B

| Pos | Team | Pld | W | L | Pts | SW | SL | SR | SPW | SPL | SPR |
|---|---|---|---|---|---|---|---|---|---|---|---|
| 1 | Iran | 4 | 4 | 0 | 8 | 12 | 1 | 12.000 | 322 | 207 | 1.556 |
| 2 | Bosnia and Herzegovina | 4 | 3 | 1 | 7 | 10 | 3 | 3.333 | 309 | 240 | 1.288 |
| 3 | Brazil | 4 | 2 | 2 | 6 | 6 | 6 | 1.000 | 257 | 230 | 1.117 |
| 4 | China | 4 | 1 | 3 | 5 | 3 | 9 | 0.333 | 243 | 266 | 0.914 |
| 5 | Rwanda | 4 | 0 | 4 | 4 | 0 | 12 | 0.000 | 115 | 300 | 0.383 |

| 30 August 2012; 16:00 | Bosnia and Herzegovina | 3–0 | China | ExCeL London, London; Referees: Toomas Murulo (EST), Mourad El-Baroudy (EGY) |
| 30 August 2012; 16:00 | (26–24, 25–21, 25–17); Report | | | ExCeL London, London; Referees: Toomas Murulo (EST), Mourad El-Baroudy (EGY) |

| 1 September 2012; 21:00 | Bosnia and Herzegovina | 3–0 | Brazil | ExCeL London, London; Referees: Anton Probst (GER), Joe Campbell (USA) |
| 1 September 2012; 21:00 | (25–14, 25–21, 25–19); Report | | | ExCeL London, London; Referees: Anton Probst (GER), Joe Campbell (USA) |

| 3 September 2012; 21:00 | Bosnia and Herzegovina | 3–0 | Rwanda | ExCeL London, London; Referees: Benno Meijer (NED), Glynn Archibald (GBR) |
| 3 September 2012; 21:00 | (25–7, 25–12, 25–8); Report | | | ExCeL London, London; Referees: Benno Meijer (NED), Glynn Archibald (GBR) |

| 4 September 2012; 16:00 | Iran | 3–1 | Bosnia and Herzegovina | ExCeL London, London; Referees: Report |
| 4 September 2012; 16:00 | (22–25, 25–18, 25–18, 25–22); Dariusz Jasinski (POL), Janko Plesnik (SLO) | | | ExCeL London, London; Referees: Report |

Quarter-final

| 5 September 2012; 14:00 | Egypt | 0–3 | Bosnia and Herzegovina | ExCeL London, London; Referees: Joe Campbell (USA), Amin Al-Traifi (KSA) |
| 5 September 2012; 14:00 | (17–25, 16–25, 22–25); Report | | | ExCeL London, London; Referees: Joe Campbell (USA), Amin Al-Traifi (KSA) |

Semi-final

| 6 September 2012; 16:00 | Germany | 0–3 | Bosnia and Herzegovina | ExCeL London, London; Referees: Jung Mal-Soon (KOR), Khalid Shanishah (LBA) |
| 6 September 2012; 16:00 | (19–25, 20–25, 14–25); Report | | | ExCeL London, London; Referees: Jung Mal-Soon (KOR), Khalid Shanishah (LBA) |

Gold medal match

| 8 September 2012; 18:00 | Bosnia and Herzegovina | 3–1 | Iran | ExCeL London, London; Referees: Anton Probst (GER), Toomas Murulo (EST) |
| 8 September 2012; 18:00 | (19–25, 25–21, 25–22, 25–15); Report | | | ExCeL London, London; Referees: Anton Probst (GER), Toomas Murulo (EST) |

== See also ==
- Bosnia and Herzegovina at the 2012 Summer Olympics
