= Bosnia and Herzegovina at the 2008 Summer Paralympics =

- IPC code: BIH
- NPC: Paralympic Committee of Bosnia and Herzegovina
- Website: www.pkbih.com

in Beijing
- Competitors: 15 in 3 sports
- Medals Ranked 63rd: Gold 0 Silver 1 Bronze 0 Total 1

Summer Paralympics appearances (overview)
- 1996; 2000; 2004; 2008; 2012; 2016; 2020; 2024

Other related appearances
- Yugoslavia (1972–2000)

Bosnia and Herzegovina sent a delegation to compete at the 2008 Summer Paralympics in Beijing, China. It was their fourth appearance in the Paralympic Games. Bosnian athletes competed in athletics, shooting and volleyball.

== Medallists ==
The country won one medal, a silver.

Medal	Name	Sport	Event
Silver	Safet Alibasic; Sabahudin Delalic; Mirzet Duran; Esad Durmisevic; Ismet Godinjak; Dzevad Hamzic; Ermin Jusufovic; Hidaet Jusufovic; Zikret Mahmic; Adnan Manko; Asim Medic; Ejub Mehmedovic	Volleyball	Men's team

== Sports ==
=== Athletics ===
==== Men's field ====
Athlete	Class	Event	Final		
Athlete	Class	Event	Result	Points	Rank
Dzevad Pandzic	F55-56	Shot put	9.02	797	15

==== Women's field ====
Athlete	Class	Event	Final		
Athlete	Class	Event	Result	Points	Rank
Dzenita Klico	F54-56	Shot put	5.39 SB	868	11

=== Shooting ===
Athlete	Event	Qualification		Final		
Athlete	Event	Score	Rank	Score	Total	Rank
Izudin Husanovic	Mixed 10m air rifle prone SH2	585	22	did not advance		

=== Volleyball ===
The men's volleyball team won the silver medal after being defeated by Iran in the gold medal final. This was the second time that the Bosnian team got defeated in a gold medal match since Sydney 2000.

==== Players ====
- Safet Alibasic
- Sabahudin Delalic
- Mirzet Duran
- Esad Durmisevic
- Ismet Godinjak
- Dzevad Hamzic
- Ermin Jusufovic
- Hidaet Jusufovic
- Zikret Mahmic
- Adnan Manko
- Asim Medic
- Ejub Mehmedovic

==== Tournament ====
7 September 2008; 15:30	China (CHN)	0–3	Bosnia and Herzegovina (BIH)	China Agricultural University Gymnasium; Attendance: 1,800; Referees: Khaled Nasr Eld Elhelaly (Egypt)
7 September 2008; 15:30	(14–25, 22–25, 17–25)			China Agricultural University Gymnasium; Attendance: 1,800; Referees: Khaled Nasr Eld Elhelaly (Egypt)

8 September 2008; 19:30	Bosnia and Herzegovina (BIH)	3-0	Iraq (IRQ)	China Agricultural University Gymnasium; Attendance: 500; Referees: Jung Mal Soon (South Korea)
8 September 2008; 19:30	(25–6, 25–14, 25–16)			China Agricultural University Gymnasium; Attendance: 500; Referees: Jung Mal Soon (South Korea)

10 September 2008; 11:30	Russia (RUS)	1–3	Bosnia and Herzegovina (BIH)	China Agricultural University Gymnasium; Attendance: 400; Referees: Janko Plesnik (Slovenia)
10 September 2008; 11:30	(21–25, 22–25, 25–18, 16–25)			China Agricultural University Gymnasium; Attendance: 400; Referees: Janko Plesnik (Slovenia)

Semifinal

12 September 2008; 12:30	Bosnia and Herzegovina (BIH)	3-0	Egypt (EGY)	China Agricultural University Gymnasium; Attendance: 400; Referees: Anton Probst (Germany)
12 September 2008; 12:30	(25–18, 25–21, 25–20)			China Agricultural University Gymnasium; Attendance: 400; Referees: Anton Probst (Germany)

Gold medal match

15 September 2008; 18:30	Iran (IRI)	3-0	Bosnia and Herzegovina (BIH)	China Agricultural University Gymnasium; Attendance: 2,000; Referees: Viktor Feldshteyn (Ukraine)
15 September 2008; 18:30	(25–22, 25–18, 25–22)			China Agricultural University Gymnasium; Attendance: 2,000; Referees: Viktor Feldshteyn (Ukraine)

== See also ==
- Bosnia and Herzegovina at the Paralympics
- Bosnia and Herzegovina at the 2008 Summer Olympics
