= Bosnia and Herzegovina at the 2004 Summer Paralympics =

- IPC code: BIH
- NPC: Paralympic Committee of Bosnia and Herzegovina
- Website: www.pkbih.com

in Athens
- Competitors: 15 in 4 sports
- Medals Ranked 57th: Gold 1 Silver 0 Bronze 0 Total 1

Summer Paralympics appearances (overview)
- 1996; 2000; 2004; 2008; 2012; 2016; 2020; 2024

Other related appearances
- Yugoslavia (1972–2000)

Bosnia-Herzegovina competed at the 2004 Summer Paralympics in Athens, Greece. The team included 15 athletes. Competitors from Bosnia-Herzegovina won one gold medal to finish 57th in the medal table.

== Medallists ==
Medal	Name	Sport	Event
Gold	Safet Alibašić; Fikret Causevic; Sabahudin Delalic; Esad Durmisevic; Ismet Godinjak; Dževad Hamzić; Ermin Jusufović; Zikret Mahmic; Adnan Manko; Asim Medić; Ejub Mehmedovic; Nedzad Salkic	Volleyball	Men's team

== Sports ==
=== Athletics ===
==== Men's field ====
Athlete	Class	Event	Final		
Athlete	Class	Event	Result	Points	Rank
Halid Mekic	F44/46	Shot put	12.43	855	11

=== Cycling ===
Athlete	Event	Time	Rank
Nezir Lupcevic	Men's road race/time trial LC1	-	14

=== Swimming ===
Athlete	Class	Event	Heats		Final	
Athlete	Class	Event	Result	Rank	Result	Rank
Admir Ahmethodzic	S9	400m freestyle	5:01.64	14	did not advance	
Admir Ahmethodzic	S9	100m backstroke	1:16.69	18	did not advance	

=== Volleyball ===
The men's volleyball team won the gold medal after defeating Iran in the gold medal final.

==== Players ====
- Safet Alibašić
- Fikret Causevic
- Sabahudin Delalic
- Esad Durmisevic
- Ismet Godinjak
- Dževad Hamzić
- Ermin Jusufović
- Zikret Mahmic
- Adnan Manko
- Asim Medić
- Ejub Mehmedovic
- Nedzad Salkic

==== Tournament ====
Game	Match	Score	Rank
1	Bosnia and Herzegovina vs. Egypt (EGY)	3 - 0	1 Q
2	Bosnia and Herzegovina vs. United States (USA)	3 - 0	1 Q
3	Bosnia and Herzegovina vs. Greece (GRE)	3 - 0	1 Q
Quarterfinals	Bosnia and Herzegovina vs. Japan (JPN)	3 - 0	W
Semi finals	Bosnia and Herzegovina vs. Germany (GER)	3 - 0	W
Gold medal final	Bosnia and Herzegovina vs. Iran (IRI)	3 - 2	1st place, gold medalist(s)

== See also ==
- Bosnia and Herzegovina at the Paralympics
- Bosnia and Herzegovina at the 2004 Summer Olympics
