= Bosnia and Herzegovina at the Paralympics =

- IPC code: BIH
- NPC: Paralympic Committee of Bosnia and Herzegovina
- Website: paraolimpijskikomitet.ba
- Medals: Gold 2 Silver 5 Bronze 1 Total 8

Summer appearances
- 1996; 2000; 2004; 2008; 2012; 2016; 2020; 2024

Winter appearances
- 2010; 2014; 2018; 2022

Other related appearances
- Yugoslavia (1972–2000)

Bosnia and Herzegovina, having become independent from the Socialist Federal Republic of Yugoslavia in 1992, made its Paralympic Games début at the 1996 Summer Paralympics in Atlanta, with merely two athletes competing in men's track and field. The country has competed in every edition of the Summer Paralympics since then, and made its Winter Paralympics début at the 2010 Winter Paralympics in Vancouver, with a single representative in alpine skiing.

Bosnia and Herzegovina has won eight Paralympic medals: seven in men's sitting volleyball (golds in 2004 and 2012, silvers in 2000, 2008, 2016, and 2024, and a bronze in 2020) and one in swimming (Ismail Barlov in 2024).

== Medallists ==
Medal	Name	Games	Sport	Event	Result
Gold	Men's team	2004 Athens	Volleyball	Sitting	1st of group B (3 wins, 0 loss); QF: 3:0 over Japan; SF: 3:0 over Germany; Final: 3:2 over Iran
Gold	Men's team	2012 London	Volleyball	Sitting	2nd of group B (3 wins, 1 loss); QF: 3:0 over Egypt; SF: 3:0 over Germany; Final: 3:1 over Iran
Silver	Men's team	2000 Sydney	Volleyball	Sitting	2nd of group B (3 wins, 2 losses) qf: 3:1 over Germany; SF: 3:0 over Egypt; Final: 0:3 to Iran
Silver	Men's team	2008 Beijing	Volleyball	Sitting	1st of group A (3 wins, 0 loss); SF: 3:0 over Egypt; Final: 0:3 to Iran
Silver	Men's team	2016 Rio	Volleyball	Sitting	Final: 1:3 to Iran
Bronze	Men's team	2020 Tokyo	Volleyball	Sitting	3rd place: 3:1 over Brazil
Silver	Men's team	2024 Paris	Volleyball	Sitting	Final: 1:3 to Iran
Silver	Ismail Barlov	2024 Paris	Swimming	SB2 50 m breaststroke	2nd

== See also ==
- Bosnia and Herzegovina at the Olympics
- Bosnia and Herzegovina men's national sitting volleyball team
