= Stevan Crnobrnja =

Bosnia and Herzegovina men's sitting volleyball player (born 1984)

Personal information
- Nationality: Bosnia and Herzegovina
- Born: 21 February 1984 (age 42); Koblenz, Rhineland-Palatinate, West Germany

National team
| Bosnia and Herzegovina |
Honours
Men's sitting volleyball
Representing Bosnia and Herzegovina
Paralympic Games
| Silver medal – second place | 2024 Paris | Team |
| Bronze medal – third place | 2020 Tokyo | Team |

Stevan Crnobrnja (born 21 February 1984) is a Bosnian Serb male sitting volleyball player and a medalist at the Summer Paralympics.

Crnobrnja started playing volleyball at the age of 15. He initially represented Serbia, with whom he took, among others, 7th place at the European Championship in 2017 and 5th place at the Continental Championship in 2019 (he was the captain of the team during the latter tournament). Then he started representing Bosnia and Herzegovina. With the colors of the new national team, he won the bronze medal at the 2020 Summer Paralympics (he scored, among others, 12 points in the match for the bronze medal against Brazil).
