= Ismail Barlov =

Bosnian Paralympic swimmer (born 2010)

Personal information
- Nationality: Bosnian
- Born: 5 September 2010 (age 16)
- Home town: Sarajevo, Bosnia and Herzegovina

Sport
- Sport: Para swimming
- Disability class: S2, SB2, SM3
- Coached by: Amel Kapo
Medal record
Men's paralympic swimming
Representing Bosnia and Herzegovina
Paralympic Games
Silver medal – second place	2024 Paris	50 m breaststroke SB2
World Championships
Silver medal – second place	2025 Singapore	50 m breaststroke SB2
European Championships
Gold medal – first place	2024 Funchal	50 m breaststroke SB2
Bronze medal – third place	2026 Kocaeli	150 m ind. medley SM3

Ismail Barlov (born 5 September 2010) is a Bosnian Paralympic swimmer. He represented Bosnia and Herzegovina at the 2024 Summer Paralympics.

== Career ==
In April 2024, Barlov competed at the 2024 World Para Swimming European Open Championships and won a gold medal in the 50 metre breaststroke SB2 event. He then represented Bosnia and Herzegovina at the 2024 Summer Paralympics and won a silver medal in the 50 metre breaststroke SB2 event. Winning the medal at 13 years old, Barlov became one of the youngest participants to win a medal.

He achieved two golds and one silver at the 2025 Croatian Open Paraswimming Championship in Zagreb.
