= Mirzet Duran =

Bosnia and Herzegovina men's sitting volleyball player

Mizret Duran

Personal information
- Nationality: Bosnia and Herzegovina
- Born: 13 October 1986 (age 40); Foča, SR Bosnia and Herzegovina, Yugoslavia

National team
Bosnia and Herzegovina
Honours
Men's sitting volleyball
Representing Bosnia and Herzegovina
Paralympic Games
Gold medal – first place	2012 London	Team
Silver medal – second place	2008 Beijing	Team
Silver medal – second place	2016 Rio	Team
Silver medal – second place	2024 Paris	Team
Bronze medal – third place	2020 Tokyo	Team

Mizret Duran (born 13 October 1986) is a Bosnian male sitting volleyball player and a multiple medalist at the Summer Paralympics.

Duran acquired his disability during the Bosnian War. When he was 6 years old, he was playing with other children in front of his house in Sarajevo, after which he lost his left foot as a result of several grenades exploding. He began playing sitting volleyball in 2003.

In the years 2008–2021, Duran won four Paralympic medals, including one gold (2012), two silvers (2008, 2016) and one bronze (2021). In London 2012, he was recognized as the tournament's best attacker, and in Rio de Janeiro 2016, he was chosen as the best serving player. As the captain of the national team, he became the vice-world champion in 2018. He was also the European champion in 2009, 2013 and 2015. As of 2019, he has played in 83 matches for the Bosnia and Herzegovina national team.

In 2017, Duran was awarded the title of outstanding international sportsman by the Ministry of Civil Affairs.
