= Nizam Čančar =

Bosnia and Herzegovina men's sitting volleyball player (born 1975)

Personal information
- Nationality: Bosnia and Herzegovina
- Born: 17 September 1975 (age 51)

Volleyball information
- Position: UN
- Number: 7

Career
Years	Teams
2012	Oki Fantomi

National team
2012	Bosnia and Herzegovina
Honours
Gold medal – first place	2012 London	Team
Silver medal – second place	2016 Rio	Team
Silver medal – second place	2024 Paris	Team
Bronze medal – third place	2020 Tokyo	Team

Nizam Čančar (born 17 September 1975) is a Bosnian male Paralympic sitting volleyball player. He is part of the Bosnia and Herzegovina national team. He competed at the 2012 Summer Paralympics winning the gold medal. On club level he played for Oki Fantomi in 2012.

He also represented Croatia national sitting volleyball team at 2006 Roermond sitting volleyball World Championships, as he did not receive a call-up by Bosnia and Herzegovina national sitting volleyball team to the tournament. Bosnia won that edition of World Championships, defeating Iran in the final 3–1. He also represented Croatia as player during 2007 sitting volleyball European championships in Nyíregyháza. Croatia lost to Bosnia 0:3 in that edition. His teammate from hometown club Fantomi Ševko Nuhanović was the coach of Croatia in that tournament. Won three medals at the Paralympic Summer Games between 2012 and 2020.

== See also ==
- Bosnia and Herzegovina at the 2012 Summer Paralympics
