= Volleyball at the 2012 Summer Paralympics – Men's tournament =

Volleyball at the XIV Paralympic Games
- Venue: ExCeL Exhibition Centre
- Dates: 30 August – 8 September 2012

Medalists
1st place, gold medalist(s)		Bosnia and Herzegovina (BIH)
2nd place, silver medalist(s)		Iran (IRI)
3rd place, bronze medalist(s)		Germany (GER)

The men's tournament in sitting volleyball at the 2012 Summer Paralympics was held between 30 August and 8 September.

== Results ==
=== Preliminary round ===
==== Group A ====
Pos	Team	Pld	W	L	Pts	SW	SL	SR	SPW	SPL	SPR
1	Germany	4	4	0	8	12	3	4.000	340	266	1.278
2	Russia	4	3	1	7	11	5	2.200	356	275	1.295
3	Egypt	4	2	2	6	9	6	1.500	424	402	1.055
4	Great Britain	4	1	3	5	3	9	0.333	230	276	0.833
5	Morocco	4	0	4	4	0	12	0.000	157	300	0.523

30 August 2012; 14:00	Great Britain	0–3	Russia	ExCeL London, London; Referees: Ronaldo Chaves (BRA), Benno Meijer (NED)
30 August 2012; 14:00	(14–25, 18–25, 20–25); Report			ExCeL London, London; Referees: Ronaldo Chaves (BRA), Benno Meijer (NED)

30 August 2012; 19:00	Egypt	3–0	Morocco	ExCeL London, London; Referees: Xin Xia (CHN), Masoud Yazdanpanah (IRI)
30 August 2012; 19:00	(25–10, 25–12, 25–22); Report			ExCeL London, London; Referees: Xin Xia (CHN), Masoud Yazdanpanah (IRI)

31 August 2012; 11:00	Germany	3–0	Morocco	ExCeL London, London; Referees: France Marcoux (CAN), Jung Mal-Soon (KOR)
31 August 2012; 11:00	(25–11, 25–10, 25–9); Report			ExCeL London, London; Referees: France Marcoux (CAN), Jung Mal-Soon (KOR)

31 August 2012; 21:00	Great Britain	0–3	Egypt	ExCeL London, London; Referees: Joe Campbell (GBR), Dariusz Jasinski (POL)
31 August 2012; 21:00	(15–25, 17–25, 22–25); Report			ExCeL London, London; Referees: Joe Campbell (GBR), Dariusz Jasinski (POL)

1 September 2012; 11:00	Russia	2–3	Germany	ExCeL London, London; Referees: Khalid Shanishah (LBA), Janko Plešnik (SLO)
1 September 2012; 11:00	(18–25, 25–11, 19–25, 25–15, 13–15); Report			ExCeL London, London; Referees: Khalid Shanishah (LBA), Janko Plešnik (SLO)

2 September 2012; 14:00	Great Britain	3–0	Morocco	ExCeL London, London; Referees: Sari Mannersuo (FIN), Stephen Giugni (AUS)
2 September 2012; 14:00	(25–20, 25–19, 25–12); Report			ExCeL London, London; Referees: Sari Mannersuo (FIN), Stephen Giugni (AUS)

2 September 2012; 21:00	Egypt	2–3	Russia	ExCeL London, London; Referees: Dominik Raca (CRO), Ronaldo Chaves (BRA)
2 September 2012; 21:00	(25–22, 25–19, 18–25, 21–25, 11–15); Report			ExCeL London, London; Referees: Dominik Raca (CRO), Ronaldo Chaves (BRA)

3 September 2012; 11:00	Great Britain	0–3	Germany	ExCeL London, London; Referees: Masoud Yazdanpanah (IRI), Xin Xia (CHN)
3 September 2012; 11:00	(19–25, 16–25, 14–25); Report			ExCeL London, London; Referees: Masoud Yazdanpanah (IRI), Xin Xia (CHN)

4 September 2012; 9:00	Egypt	1–3	Germany	ExCeL London, London; Referees: Toomas Murulo (EST), Dominik Raca (CRO)
4 September 2012; 9:00	(16–25, 22–25, 25–23, 24–26); Report			ExCeL London, London; Referees: Toomas Murulo (EST), Dominik Raca (CRO)

4 September 2012; 14:00	Russia	3–0	Morocco	ExCeL London, London; Referees: Adnan Kolos (BIH), Dimosthenis Kostopoulos (GRE)
4 September 2012; 14:00	(25–13, 25–8, 25–11); Report			ExCeL London, London; Referees: Adnan Kolos (BIH), Dimosthenis Kostopoulos (GRE)

==== Group B ====
Pos	Team	Pld	W	L	Pts	SW	SL	SR	SPW	SPL	SPR
1	Iran	4	4	0	8	12	1	12.000	322	207	1.556
2	Bosnia and Herzegovina	4	3	1	7	10	3	3.333	309	240	1.288
3	Brazil	4	2	2	6	6	6	1.000	257	230	1.117
4	China	4	1	3	5	3	9	0.333	243	266	0.914
5	Rwanda	4	0	4	4	0	12	0.000	115	300	0.383

30 August 2012; 16:00	Bosnia and Herzegovina	3–0	China	ExCeL London, London; Referees: Toomas Murulo (EST), Mourad El-Baroudy (EGY)
30 August 2012; 16:00	(26–24, 25–21, 25–17); Report			ExCeL London, London; Referees: Toomas Murulo (EST), Mourad El-Baroudy (EGY)

30 August 2012; 21:00	Iran	3–0	Rwanda	ExCeL London, London; Referees: Janko Plešnik (SLO), Dee Wauchope (GBR)
30 August 2012; 21:00	(25–11, 25–6, 25–8); Report			ExCeL London, London; Referees: Janko Plešnik (SLO), Dee Wauchope (GBR)

31 August 2012; 14:00	Brazil	3–0	Rwanda	ExCeL London, London; Referees: Stephen Giugni (AUS), Glynn Archibald (GBR)
31 August 2012; 14:00	(25–5, 25–5, 25–13); Report			ExCeL London, London; Referees: Stephen Giugni (AUS), Glynn Archibald (GBR)

1 September 2012; 14:00	Iran	3–0	China	ExCeL London, London; Referees: Dimosthenis Kostopoulos (GRE), Amin Al-Traifi (KSA)
1 September 2012; 14:00	(25–15, 25–19, 25–12); Report			ExCeL London, London; Referees: Dimosthenis Kostopoulos (GRE), Amin Al-Traifi (KSA)

1 September 2012; 21:00	Bosnia and Herzegovina	3–0	Brazil	ExCeL London, London; Referees: Anton Probst (GER), Joe Campbell (USA)
1 September 2012; 21:00	(25–14, 25–21, 25–19); Report			ExCeL London, London; Referees: Anton Probst (GER), Joe Campbell (USA)

2 September 2012; 9:00	China	3–0	Rwanda	ExCeL London, London; Referees: Dee Wauchope (GBR), Ute Fischer (GER)
2 September 2012; 9:00	(25–10, 25–13, 25–17); Report			ExCeL London, London; Referees: Dee Wauchope (GBR), Ute Fischer (GER)

3 September 2012; 14:00	Iran	3–0	Brazil	ExCeL London, London; Referees: Amin Al-Traifi (KSA), Mourad El-Baroudy (EGY)
3 September 2012; 14:00	(25–21, 25–15, 25–17); Report			ExCeL London, London; Referees: Amin Al-Traifi (KSA), Mourad El-Baroudy (EGY)

3 September 2012; 21:00	Bosnia and Herzegovina	3–0	Rwanda	ExCeL London, London; Referees: Benno Meijer (NED), Glynn Archibald (GBR)
3 September 2012; 21:00	(25–7, 25–12, 25–8); Report			ExCeL London, London; Referees: Benno Meijer (NED), Glynn Archibald (GBR)

4 September 2012; 11:00	Brazil	3–0	China	ExCeL London, London; Referees: Report
4 September 2012; 11:00	(25–17, 25–23, 25–20); Sari Mannersuo (FIN), Anton Probst (GER)			ExCeL London, London; Referees: Report

4 September 2012; 16:00	Iran	3–1	Bosnia and Herzegovina	ExCeL London, London; Referees: Report
4 September 2012; 16:00	(22–25, 25–18, 25–18, 25–22); Dariusz Jasinski (POL), Janko Plesnik (SLO)			ExCeL London, London; Referees: Report

=== Final round ===
Quarter-finals
Germany	3
China	2
Egypt	0
Bosnia and Herzegovina	3
Russia	3
Brazil	2
Great Britain	0
Iran	3

Semi-finals
Germany	0
Bosnia and Herzegovina	3
Russia	0
Iran	3

Final
Bosnia and Herzegovina	3
Iran	1
Third place
Germany	3
Russia	2

==== Quarter-finals ====
5 September 2012; 9:00	Germany	3–2	China	ExCeL London, London; Referees: Adnan Kolos (BIH), France Marcoux (CAN)
5 September 2012; 9:00	(19–25, 21–25, 25–21, 25–19, 15–10); Report			ExCeL London, London; Referees: Adnan Kolos (BIH), France Marcoux (CAN)

5 September 2012; 11:20	Russia	3–2	Brazil	ExCeL London, London; Referees: Khalid Shanishah (LBA), Jung Mal-Soon (KOR)
5 September 2012; 11:20	(18–25, 25–15, 25–15, 19–25, 15–8); Report			ExCeL London, London; Referees: Khalid Shanishah (LBA), Jung Mal-Soon (KOR)

5 September 2012; 14:00	Egypt	0–3	Bosnia and Herzegovina	ExCeL London, London; Referees: Joe Campbell (USA), Amin Al-Traifi (KSA)
5 September 2012; 14:00	(17–25, 16–25, 22–25); Report			ExCeL London, London; Referees: Joe Campbell (USA), Amin Al-Traifi (KSA)

5 September 2012; 21:20	Great Britain	0–3	Iran	ExCeL London, London; Referees: Dimosthenis Kostopoulos (GRE), Ute Fisher (GER)
5 September 2012; 21:20	(18–25, 13–25, 15–25); Report			ExCeL London, London; Referees: Dimosthenis Kostopoulos (GRE), Ute Fisher (GER)

==== Semi-finals ====
6 September 2012; 16:00	Germany	0–3	Bosnia and Herzegovina	ExCeL London, London; Referees: Jung Mal-Soon (KOR), Khalid Shanishah (LBA)
6 September 2012; 16:00	(19–25, 20–25, 14–25); Report			ExCeL London, London; Referees: Jung Mal-Soon (KOR), Khalid Shanishah (LBA)

6 September 2012; 21:00	Russia	0–3	Iran	ExCeL London, London; Referees: Benno Meijer (NED), Ronaldo Chaves (BRA)
6 September 2012; 21:00	(15–25, 18–25, 18–25); Report			ExCeL London, London; Referees: Benno Meijer (NED), Ronaldo Chaves (BRA)

==== Bronze medal match ====
8 September 2012; 16:00	Germany	3–2	Russia	ExCeL London, London; Referees: Dariusz Jasinski (POL), Glynn Archibald (GBR)
8 September 2012; 16:00	(20–25, 26–24, 22–25, 25–22, 16–14); Report			ExCeL London, London; Referees: Dariusz Jasinski (POL), Glynn Archibald (GBR)

==== Gold medal match ====
8 September 2012; 18:00	Bosnia and Herzegovina	3–1	Iran	ExCeL London, London; Referees: Anton Probst (GER), Toomas Murulo (EST)
8 September 2012; 18:00	(19–25, 25–21, 25–22, 25–15); Report			ExCeL London, London; Referees: Anton Probst (GER), Toomas Murulo (EST)

=== Classification round ===
5th–8th place semi-finals
China	2
Egypt	3
Brazil	3
Great Britain	0

5th–6th place match
Egypt	2
Brazil	3
7th–8th place match
China	3
Great Britain	0

==== 5th–8th place semi-finals ====
6 September 2012; 14:00	China	2–3	Egypt	ExCeL London, London; Referees: Dominik Raca (CRO), Sari Mannersuo (FIN)
6 September 2012; 14:00	(25–16, 23–25, 23–25, 25–17, 11–15); Report			ExCeL London, London; Referees: Dominik Raca (CRO), Sari Mannersuo (FIN)

6 September 2012; 19:00	Brazil	3–0	Great Britain	ExCeL London, London; Referees: Amin Al-Traifi (KSA), Dariusz Jasinski (POL)
6 September 2012; 19:00	(25–20, 25–16, 25–15); Report			ExCeL London, London; Referees: Amin Al-Traifi (KSA), Dariusz Jasinski (POL)

==== 7th–8th place match ====
7 September 2012; 16:00	China	3–0	Great Britain	ExCeL London, London; Referees: Toomas Murulo (EST)
7 September 2012; 16:00	(25–14, 25–16, 25–22); Report			ExCeL London, London; Referees: Toomas Murulo (EST)

==== 5th–6th place match ====
8 September 2012; 14:00	Egypt	2–3	Brazil	ExCeL London, London; Referees: Masoud Yazdanpanah (IRI), Benno Meijer (NED)
8 September 2012; 14:00	(14–25, 25–15, 21–25, 25–15, 13–15); Report			ExCeL London, London; Referees: Masoud Yazdanpanah (IRI), Benno Meijer (NED)

==== 9th–10th place match ====
7 September 2012; 14:00	Morocco	1–3	Rwanda	ExCeL London, London; Referees: Dee Wauchope (GBR)
7 September 2012; 14:00	(25–20, 25–27, 22–25, 23–25); Report			ExCeL London, London; Referees: Dee Wauchope (GBR)

== Final ranking ==
Rank	Team
Gold medal	Bosnia and Herzegovina
Silver medal	Iran
Bronze medal	Germany
4	Russia
5	Egypt
6	Brazil
7	China
8	Great Britain
9	Rwanda
10	Morocco

== See also ==
- Volleyball at the 2012 Summer Paralympics – Women's tournament
