= Sitting volleyball at the 2016 Summer Paralympics – Men =

Paralympic Tournament

Sitting volleyball at the XV Paralympic Games
- Venue: Riocentro - Pavilion 6
- Dates: 9–18 September 2016
- Competitors: 96 from 8 nations

Medalists
1st place, gold medalist(s)		Iran
2nd place, silver medalist(s)		Bosnia and Herzegovina
3rd place, bronze medalist(s)		Egypt

The men's tournament in sitting volleyball at the 2016 Summer Paralympics was held between 9 and 18 September.

== Results ==
=== Preliminary round ===
==== Group A ====
Pos	Team	Pld	W	L	Pts	SW	SL	SR	SPW	SPL	SPR	Qualification
1	Egypt	3	3	0	6	9	4	2.250	267	234	1.141	Semi-finals
2	Brazil (H)	3	2	1	5	8	4	2.000	278	212	1.311	Semi-finals
3	Germany	3	1	2	4	6	8	0.750	280	288	0.972	Classification 5th / 6th
4	United States	3	0	3	3	2	9	0.222	167	258	0.647	Classification 7th / 8th

Source: Paralympic.org
(H) Host

9 September 2016; 10:00	Brazil	3–0	United States	Riocentro - Pavilion 6, Rio de Janeiro
9 September 2016; 10:00	(25–14, 25–17, 25–14); Report			Riocentro - Pavilion 6, Rio de Janeiro

9 September 2016; 14:00	Egypt	3–2	Germany	Riocentro - Pavilion 6, Rio de Janeiro
9 September 2016; 14:00	(18–25, 21–25, 25–22, 25–14, 15–7); Report			Riocentro - Pavilion 6, Rio de Janeiro

11 September 2016; 10:00	Brazil	2–3	Egypt	Riocentro - Pavilion 6, Rio de Janeiro
11 September 2016; 10:00	(18–25, 25–13, 23–25, 25–10, 13–15); Report			Riocentro - Pavilion 6, Rio de Janeiro

11 September 2016; 18:30	United States	2–3	Germany	Riocentro - Pavilion 6, Rio de Janeiro
11 September 2016; 18:30	(25–20, 15–25, 10–25, 25–23, 10–15); Report			Riocentro - Pavilion 6, Rio de Janeiro

13 September 2016; 14:00	Egypt	3–0	United States	Riocentro - Pavilion 6, Rio de Janeiro
13 September 2016; 14:00	(25–14, 25–9, 25–14); Report			Riocentro - Pavilion 6, Rio de Janeiro

13 September 2016; 20:30	Germany	1–3	Brazil	Riocentro - Pavilion 6, Rio de Janeiro
13 September 2016; 20:30	(26–24, 23–25, 18–25, 12–25); Report			Riocentro - Pavilion 6, Rio de Janeiro

==== Group B ====
Pos	Team	Pld	W	L	Pts	SW	SL	SR	SPW	SPL	SPR	Qualification
1	Iran	3	3	0	6	9	0	MAX	228	173	1.318	Semi-finals
2	Bosnia and Herzegovina	3	2	1	5	6	3	2.000	206	184	1.120	Semi-finals
3	Ukraine	3	1	2	4	3	8	0.375	237	265	0.894	Classification 5th / 6th
4	China	3	0	3	3	2	9	0.222	216	265	0.815	Classification 7th / 8th

Source: Paralympic.org

10 September 2016; 10:00	Iran	3–0	China	Riocentro - Pavilion 6, Rio de Janeiro
10 September 2016; 10:00	(25–22, 25–13, 25–14); Report			Riocentro - Pavilion 6, Rio de Janeiro

10 September 2016; 20:30	Bosnia and Herzegovina	3–0	Ukraine	Riocentro - Pavilion 6, Rio de Janeiro
10 September 2016; 20:30	(25–12, 25–22, 25–20); Report			Riocentro - Pavilion 6, Rio de Janeiro

12 September 2016; 14:00	China	2–3	Ukraine	Riocentro - Pavilion 6, Rio de Janeiro
12 September 2016; 14:00	(28–26, 25–23, 23–25, 22–25, 14–16); Report			Riocentro - Pavilion 6, Rio de Janeiro

12 September 2016; 20:30	Iran	3–0	Bosnia and Herzegovina	Riocentro - Pavilion 6, Rio de Janeiro
12 September 2016; 20:30	(25–17, 25–22, 25–17); Report			Riocentro - Pavilion 6, Rio de Janeiro

14 September 2016; 18:30	Bosnia and Herzegovina	3–0	China	Riocentro - Pavilion 6, Rio de Janeiro
14 September 2016; 18:30	(25–14, 25–22, 25–19); Report			Riocentro - Pavilion 6, Rio de Janeiro

14 September 2016; 20:30	Ukraine	0–3	Iran	Riocentro - Pavilion 6, Rio de Janeiro
14 September 2016; 20:30	(22–25, 26–28, 20–25); Report			Riocentro - Pavilion 6, Rio de Janeiro

=== Knock-out stage ===
==== Bracket ====
Semi-finals
16 September
Egypt	0
Bosnia and Herzegovina	3
16 September
Brazil	0
Iran	3

Gold medal
18 September
Bosnia and Herzegovina	1
Iran	3
Bronze medal
18 September
Egypt	3
Brazil	2

==== Classification 7th / 8th ====
16 September 2016; 13:30	United States	0–3	China	Riocentro - Pavilion 6, Rio de Janeiro
16 September 2016; 13:30	(15–25, 16–25, 17–25); Report			Riocentro - Pavilion 6, Rio de Janeiro

==== Classification fifth / sixth ====
16 September 2016; 15:30	Germany	1–3	Ukraine	Riocentro - Pavilion 6, Rio de Janeiro
16 September 2016; 15:30	(21–25, 25–22, 19–25, 23–25); Report			Riocentro - Pavilion 6, Rio de Janeiro

==== Semi-finals ====
16 September 2016; 18:30	Egypt	0–3	Bosnia and Herzegovina	Riocentro - Pavilion 6, Rio de Janeiro
16 September 2016; 18:30	(23–25, 16–25, 20–25); Report			Riocentro - Pavilion 6, Rio de Janeiro

16 September 2016; 20:30	Brazil	0–3	Iran	Riocentro - Pavilion 6, Rio de Janeiro
16 September 2016; 20:30	(20–25, 19–25, 17–25); Report			Riocentro - Pavilion 6, Rio de Janeiro

==== Bronze medal game ====
18 September 2016; 09:30	Egypt	3–2	Brazil	Riocentro - Pavilion 6, Rio de Janeiro
18 September 2016; 09:30	(28–26, 29–31, 19–25, 25–22, 15–13); Report			Riocentro - Pavilion 6, Rio de Janeiro

==== Gold medal game ====
18 September 2016; 12:35	Bosnia and Herzegovina	1–3	Iran	Riocentro - Pavilion 6, Rio de Janeiro
18 September 2016; 12:35	(21–25, 25–21, 18–25, 15–25); Report			Riocentro - Pavilion 6, Rio de Janeiro

== Final ranking ==
Rank	Team
Gold medal	Iran
Silver medal	Bosnia and Herzegovina
Bronze medal	Egypt
4	Brazil
5	Ukraine
6	Germany
7	China
8	United States

== See also ==
- Sitting volleyball at the 2016 Summer Paralympics – Women
