= Adnan Manko =

Bosnian sitting volleyball player (born 1977)

Personal information
- Born: 16 January 1977 (age 49); Sarajevo, Yugoslavia

Volleyball information
- Current club: SDI Spid

Career
Years	Teams
c. 1994–2013	OKI Fantomi
2013–present	SDI Spid

National team
1997–present	Bosnia and Herzegovina
Honours
Men's sitting volleyball
Representing Bosnia and Herzegovina
Paralympic Games
Gold medal – first place	2004 Athens	Team
Gold medal – first place	2012 London	Team
Silver medal – second place	2000 Sydney	Team
Silver medal – second place	2008 Beijing	Team
Silver medal – second place	2016 Rio	Team
Silver medal – second place	2024 Paris	Team
Bronze medal – third place	2020 Tokyo	Team

Adnan Manko (born 16 January 1977) is a Bosnian sitting volleyball player. A member of the Bosnia and Herzegovina national sitting volleyball team, he won medals at the 2000, 2004, 2008, 2012, 2016, 2020 and 2024 Summer Paralympics.

== Biography ==
Manko was born on 16 January 1977 in Sarajevo, Yugoslavia. He started playing sitting volleyball in 1994. He recalled that "One of my neighbours played sitting volleyball before the [Bosnian] war and invited me to start training. Never before in my life had I played volleyball, but after just a few training sessions I loved the sport." He was selected for the Bosnia and Herzegovina national sitting volleyball team in 1997 and became one of their leading players in subsequent years, having recorded 148 appearances by 2019, a joint-record held along with Ismet Godinjak, Dževad Hamzić and Sabahudin Delalić.

Manko helped the Bosnian sitting volleyball team to a bronze medal at the European Championships in 1997, which was followed by a gold medal in 1999 and further titles in 2001, 2003, 2005, 2007, 2009, 2011, 2013, and 2015. After a bronze in 2017, and a silver in 2019, Manko helped Bosnia win another title in 2021 and their 11th European Championship in 2023. He also has competed for Bosnia many times at the World Para Volleyball Championship, helping them win bronze in 1998, gold in 2002, 2006, and 2014, and silver in 2010, 2018, and 2022. At the 2002 World Championships, held in Cairo, Egypt, Manko was named the tournament's best defender.

Manko has competed for Bosnia at every Summer Paralympics since 2000, contributing to their gold medals in 2004 and 2012, silver medals in 2000, 2008, 2016, and 2024, and a bronze medal in 2020. From 2000 to 2016, Bosnia reached the finals at every Paralympics, and Manko is one of five Bosnians – along with Godinjak, Hamzić, Delalić, and Asim Medić – to have won seven career Paralympic medals.

Early in his club career, Manko was a member of the leading Bosnian team OKI Fantomi. He eventually became the club's team captain, before leaving in 2013 for the rival team SDI Spid, where he remained as of 2024. Manko was named the Bosnian most successful disabled athlete in 2002, and in 2008 and 2015, he was honored as the Para Athlete of the Year. In 2020, Manko was honored by World ParaVolley with the Recognition Award, given for "the recipient's significant contribution towards and development of sitting volleyball." In 2024, he was honored by the Ministry of Civil Affairs with the title of Top Athlete of the International Class of Bosnia and Herzegovina.

Manko has two daughters.
