= Safet Alibašić =

Bosnia and Herzegovina men's sitting volleyball player (born 1982)

Personal information
- Nationality: Bosnia and Herzegovina
- Born: 21 December 1982 (age 43); Tuzla, SR Bosnia and Herzegovina, Yugoslavia

Volleyball information
- Number: 10

National team
Bosnia and Herzegovina
Honours
Men's sitting volleyball
Representing Bosnia and Herzegovina
Paralympic Games
Gold medal – first place	2004 Athens	Team
Gold medal – first place	2012 London	Team
Silver medal – second place	2008 Beijing	Team
Silver medal – second place	2016 Rio	Team
Silver medal – second place	2024 Paris	Team
Bronze medal – third place	2020 Tokyo	Team

Safet Alibašić (born 21 December 1982) is a Bosnian male sitting volleyball player. A six-time medalist at the Summer Paralympics, he has won two gold and three silver medals, as well as one bronze across six consecutive Games between 2004 and 2024. Further to his Paralympic medals, he is a three-time winner of the World Para Volleyball Championship (2002, 2006, 2014).

== Biography ==
Alibašić began club sitting volleyball with Lukavac in 1997. He became part of the Bosnia and Herzegovina national team in 2001. He stood on the podium of the world and European championships: He won Gold in the World Para Volleyball Championship in 2002, 2006, and 2014, when he was also named International Paralympic Committee Athlete of the Month for June that year. He also won the European championship in 2001, 2003, 2009 and 2013.

He was successful as part of his national team in Paralympic Games: at the 2004 Games he won gold, which he followed with silver in 2008. In 2012 he won a second gold and in 2016 a second silver. At the 2020 Games, held in 2021, he won bronze. By 2019 he had played in 119 matches for the Bosnia and Herzegovina national team.

Alibašić was named the Best Athlete of 2013 for disabled sports in Sarajevo, after helping his nation win their eighth consecutive European title. In 2017, Alibašić was awarded the title of outstanding international sportsman by Bosnia and Herzegovina's Ministry of Civil Affairs. Alibašić won gold with his national team in the 2023 Sitting Volleyball European Championships – Men's event. In 2024 he was selected as his nation's flag-bearer in the 2024 Summer Paralympics opening ceremony in Paris.
