= Asim Medić =

Bosnian sitting volleyball player (born 1969)

Personal information
- Nationality: Bosnia and Herzegovina
- Born: 3 August 1969 (age 57); Stari Grad, Sarajevo, Yugoslavia

Volleyball information
- Position: UN
- Number: 5

Career
Years	Teams
1996–present	SDI Spid

National team
1997–present	Bosnia and Herzegovina
Honours
Men's sitting volleyball
Representing Bosnia and Herzegovina
Paralympic Games
Gold medal – first place	2004 Athens	Team
Gold medal – first place	2012 London	Team
Silver medal – second place	2000 Sydney	Team
Silver medal – second place	2008 Beijing	Team
Silver medal – second place	2016 Rio	Team
Silver medal – second place	2024 Paris	Team
Bronze medal – third place	2020 Tokyo	Team

Asim Medić (born 3 August 1969) is a Bosnian sitting volleyball player. A member of the Bosnia and Herzegovina national sitting volleyball team, he won medals at the 2000, 2004, 2008, 2012, 2016, 2020 and 2024 Summer Paralympics.

== Biography ==
Medić was born on 3 August 1969 in Stari Grad, Sarajevo, Yugoslavia, where he grew up. As a youth, he competed as a sport shooter, winning the junior national championship of Yugoslavia in 1986 and later the national championship. He served in the Bosnian War and in 1993, was hit by an artillery shell that tore his leg off. According to the Associated Press, "It felt like the end of life, but part of the rehabilitation doctors recommended was playing sports, especially to fight off depression."

Medić joined the club SDI Spid in 1995. He was a shooting instructor and competed as a shooter, winning a Bosnian championship that year. He recalled that for a few months, he was invited to play sitting volleyball by members of the club, but initially was not interested. In 1996, he agreed to try out the sport and quickly showed talent. He was called up to the Bosnia and Herzegovina national sitting volleyball team in 1997.

Medić remained a member of the national team in subsequent years and contributed to their successes at international competitions, with Bosnia winning a bronze medal at the European Championships in 1997, which was followed by a gold medal in 1999 and further titles in 2001, 2003, 2005, 2007, 2009, 2011, 2013, and 2015. Bosnia then won a bronze in 2017, a silver in 2019, and then another title in 2021 and their 11th European Championship in 2023. He has also competed in some of Bosnia's appearances at the World Para Volleyball Championship, with the national team winning bronze in 1998, gold in 2002, 2006, and 2014, and silver in 2010, 2018, and 2022.

Medić has competed for Bosnia at every Summer Paralympics since 2000, contributing to their gold medals in 2004 and 2012, silver medals in 2000, 2008, 2016, and 2024, and a bronze medal in 2020. From 2000 to 2016, Bosnia reached the finals at every Paralympics, and Medić is one of five Bosnians – along with Ismet Godinjak, Dževad Hamzić, Sabahudin Delalić and Adnan Manko – to have won seven career Paralympic medals. He has also competed for Bosnia in sitting beach volleyball, and his club, SDI Spid, has been very successful, having won 18 national championships by 2016.

Medić was honored as the Best Para Athlete in Bosnia and Herzegovina in 1998 and 1999. He was named the Best Athlete at the 1998 European Champions Cup, and in 2020, he was given the Recognition Award from World ParaVolley, for his "contribution towards sitting volleyball and the development of the sport."

Medić lives in Sarajevo and has a son. He runs a restaurant in the Sarajevo neighborhood of Grbavica, called "Plavi zamak".
