= Dževad Hamzić =

Bosnian sitting volleyball player (born 1968)

Personal information
- Born: 4 September 1968 (age 58)

Volleyball information
- Current club: SDI Spid

Career
Years	Teams
1996–1998	"A" club
1998–present	SDI Spid

National team
1998–present	Bosnia and Herzegovina
Honours
Men's sitting volleyball
Representing Bosnia and Herzegovina
Paralympic Games
Gold medal – first place	2004 Athens	Team
Gold medal – first place	2012 London	Team
Silver medal – second place	2000 Sydney	Team
Silver medal – second place	2008 Beijing	Team
Silver medal – second place	2016 Rio	Team
Silver medal – second place	2024 Paris	Team
Bronze medal – third place	2020 Tokyo	Team

Dževad Hamzić (born 4 September 1968) is a Bosnian sitting volleyball player. A member of the Bosnia and Herzegovina national sitting volleyball team, he won medals at the 2000, 2004, 2008, 2012, 2016, 2020 and 2024 Summer Paralympics.

== Biography ==
Hamzić was born on 4 September 1968. He served in the Bosnian War as a member of the Bosnian Army. While serving in the war, he stepped on a mine in the village of Nišići, leaving him visually impaired and requiring a leg amputation. As part of his rehabilitation, he started playing sitting volleyball in 1996. Beginning with the "A" club that year, he later joined the club SDI Spid in 1998.

Hamzić was called up to the Bosnia and Herzegovina national sitting volleyball team in 1998 and has been one of the main players for the team since; by 2019, he had appeared in 148 matches, a joint-record he shared with Sabahudin Delalić, Ismet Godinjak and Adnan Manko. Hamzić helped the Bosnian sitting volleyball team to a bronze medal at the European Championships in 1997, which was followed by a gold medal in 1999 and further titles in 2001, 2003, 2005, 2007, 2009, 2011, 2013, and 2015. After a bronze in 2017, and a silver in 2019, Hamzić helped Bosnia win another title in 2021 and their 11th European Championship in 2023. He also has competed for Bosnia many times at the World Para Volleyball Championship, helping them win bronze in 1998, gold in 2002, 2006, and 2014, and silver in 2010, 2018, and 2022.

Hamzić has competed for Bosnia at every Summer Paralympics since 2000, contributing to their gold medals in 2004 and 2012, silver medals in 2000, 2008, 2016, and 2024, and a bronze medal in 2020. From 2000 to 2016, Bosnia reached the finals at every Paralympics, and Hamzić is one of five Bosnians – along with Manko, Godinjak, Delalić, and Asim Medić – to have won seven career Paralympic medals. In total, he has won over 30 medals from major competitions. In addition to his international success, he has also helped his club, SDI Spid, to numerous national and international championships. By 2016, he had won a total of 18 Bosnian championships with his club. In addition to playing for SDI Spid, he is also their president.

Hamzić has received a number of honors in his career. He was named the best setter at the 2007 European Championships and the most valuable player at the 2023 Men's EuroLeague. He was named the Bosnian Athlete of the Year in 2007 and 2016 and has received the Golden Lily Plaque as well as the Sixth of April Sarajevo Award, the highest honor in the Bosnian capital of Sarajevo. In 2020, he was given the Recognition Award by World ParaVolley, for "the recipient's significant contribution towards and development of sitting volleyball," and in 2023, he was given the organization's Distinguished Service award.

Hamzić is married.
