= Ismet Godinjak =

Bosnian sitting volleyball player (born 1973)

Personal information
- Born: 17 March 1973 (age 53); Sarajevo, Yugoslavia

Volleyball information
- Current club: OKI Fantomi

National team
1995–present	Bosnia and Herzegovina
Honours
Men's sitting volleyball
Representing Bosnia and Herzegovina
Paralympic Games
Gold medal – first place	2004 Athens	Team
Gold medal – first place	2012 London	Team
Silver medal – second place	2000 Sydney	Team
Silver medal – second place	2008 Beijing	Team
Silver medal – second place	2016 Rio	Team
Silver medal – second place	2024 Paris	Team
Bronze medal – third place	2020 Tokyo	Team

Ismet Godinjak (born 17 March 1973) is a Bosnian sitting volleyball player. A member of the Bosnia and Herzegovina national sitting volleyball team, he won medals at the 2000, 2004, 2008, 2012, 2016, 2020 and 2024 Summer Paralympics.

== Biography ==
Godinjak was born on 17 March 1973 in Sarajevo, Yugoslavia. He grew up playing volleyball, and after the Bosnian War, began competing in sitting volleyball as part of his rehabilitation. He was selected for the Bosnia and Herzegovina national sitting volleyball team and debuted for them at the 1995 European Championships in Ljubljana. He has been one of the main players for the team since, having competed for the team in 148 matches by 2019, a record he jointly-held with Dževad Hamzić, Sabahudin Delalić, and Adnan Manko.

Godinjak helped the Bosnian sitting volleyball team to a bronze medal at the European Championships in 1997, which was followed by a gold medal in 1999 and further titles in 2001, 2003, 2005, 2007, 2009, 2011, 2013, and 2015. After a bronze in 2017, and a silver in 2019, Godinjak helped Bosnia win another title in 2021 and their 11th European Championship in 2023. He also has competed for Bosnia many times at the World Para Volleyball Championship, helping them win bronze in 1998, gold in 2002, 2006, and 2014, and silver in 2010, 2018, and 2022.

Godinjak has competed for Bosnia at every Summer Paralympics since 2000, contributing to their gold medals in 2004 and 2012, silver medals in 2000, 2008, 2016, and 2024, and a bronze medal in 2020. From 2000 to 2016, Bosnia reached the finals at every Paralympics, and Godinjak is one of five Bosnians – along with Manko, Hamzić, Delalić, and Asim Medić – to have won seven career Paralympic medals.

On a club level, Godinjak competes for OKI Fantomi, which he co-founded and serves as president for. His club is among the most successful in Bosnia, having won a number of national championships and their seventh-consecutive European Championship in 2024. Godinjak was named the male disabled athlete of the year in Bosnia in 2007 and 2011. He was given the Recognition Award from World ParaVolley in 2020, given for "the recipient's significant contribution towards and development of sitting volleyball." He was named the Best Male Libero at the 2021 and 2023 European Championships, and in 2024, he was honored by the Ministry of Civil Affairs with the title of Top Athlete of the International Class of Bosnia and Herzegovina.

Godinjak has two sons.
