= Sabahudin Delalić =

Bosnian sitting volleyball player (born 1972)

Personal information
- Born: 17 August 1972 (age 54); Sarajevo, Yugoslavia

Volleyball information
- Current club: SDI Spid

Career
Years	Teams
1996–present	SDI Spid

National team
1996–present	Bosnia and Herzegovina
Honours
Men's sitting volleyball
Representing Bosnia and Herzegovina
Paralympic Games
Gold medal – first place	2004 Athens	Team
Gold medal – first place	2012 London	Team
Silver medal – second place	2000 Sydney	Team
Silver medal – second place	2008 Beijing	Team
Silver medal – second place	2016 Rio	Team
Silver medal – second place	2024 Paris	Team
Bronze medal – third place	2020 Tokyo	Team

Sabahudin Delalić (born 17 August 1972) is a Bosnian sitting volleyball player. The captain of the Bosnia and Herzegovina national sitting volleyball team, he won medals at the 2000, 2004, 2008, 2012, 2016, 2020 and 2024 Summer Paralympics. He has helped Bosnia and Herzegovina win medals at over 25 international competitions and served as the Bosnian flagbearer at two Paralympics.

== Early life ==
Delalić was born on 17 August 1972 in Sarajevo, Yugoslavia. He received his education in Sarajevo and graduated with a master's degree from the Faculty of Sports and Physical Education at the University of Sarajevo. He served in the Bosnian War, but was wounded in the village of Azići in 1992, being hit by tank fire that required a partial amputation of his leg. As part of his rehabilitation, he began playing sports. He described that "This is perhaps the best way for psychological and physical rehabilitation for people with different kinds of impairments. Everybody, including me, has changed a lot by playing sports. We understand our wounds differently. Sport makes us equal with others."

== Volleyball career ==
Delalić began playing sitting volleyball with the club SDI Spid in 1996, and was called up to the Bosnia and Herzegovina national sitting volleyball team the same year. He became one of the national team's leading players in subsequent years, having recorded 148 appearances by 2019, a joint-record held along with Ismet Godinjak, Dževad Hamzić and Adnan Manko. He became the team's captain in 2001 and contributed to their successes at numerous international competitions, having won a total of 27 international medals by the time of the 2024 Summer Paralympics.

Delalić helped the Bosnian sitting volleyball team to a bronze medal at the European Championships in 1997, which was followed by a gold medal in 1999 and further titles in 2001, 2003, 2005, 2007, 2009, 2011, 2013, and 2015. After a bronze in 2017 and a silver in 2019, Delalić helped Bosnia win another title in 2021 and their 11th European Championship in 2023. He also has competed for Bosnia many times at the World Para Volleyball Championship, helping them win bronze in 1998, gold in 2002, 2006, and 2014, and silver in 2010, 2018, and 2022.

Delalić has competed for Bosnia at every Summer Paralympics since 2000, contributing to their gold medals in 2004 and 2012, silver medals in 2000, 2008, 2016, and 2024, and a bronze medal in 2020. From 2000 to 2016, Bosnia reached the finals at every Paralympics, and Delalić is one of five Bosnians – along with Godinjak, Hamzić, Manko, and Asim Medić – to have won seven career Paralympic medals. His club, SDI Spid, has also been successful, having won 18 national championships by 2016.

Delalić has received many honors for his success in Bosnian sitting volleyball, being named the Bosnian Para Athlete of the Year in 1999, 2003, and 2023, as well as the Male Para Athlete of the Year in the Sarajevo Canton in 2014. He was honored as the Best Setter at the 2015 European Championships, 2022 World Championships, and the 2023 Men's EuroLeague. He served as the flagbearer for Bosnia and Herzegovina at the 2008 and 2012 Paralympics. He was given the Recognition award from World ParaVolley in 2020, for "the recipient's significant contribution towards and development of sitting volleyball," and in 2023, he was given the organization's Distinguished Service award. He has also received the Sixth of April Sarajevo Award and the Golden Lily plaque. Delalić serves as President of the Paralympic Committee of Bosnia and Herzegovina and is a member of the board of directors of the national sitting volleyball team.

== Personal life ==
Delalić is also active in politics. A member of the Party of Democratic Action (SDA), he was elected the chairman of the Sarajevo City Council in March 2013. He later resigned from the City Council in November 2014 to assume office as a member of the Assembly of Sarajevo Canton. He served in that position until November 2022.
