= Bosnia and Herzegovina national sitting volleyball team =

National sports team

Bosnia and Herzegovina Savez sjedeće odbojke Bosne i Hercegovine
- Nickname(s): Zlatni Ljiljani (Golden Lilies), Zmajevi (Dragons)
- Association: Association of sitting volleyball of Bosnia and Herzegovina
- Head coach: Ifet Mahmutović

Uniforms
Home	Away

Summer Paralympics
- Appearances: 7 since 2000
- Best result: (2) 2004, 2012

World Championship
- Appearances: 7 since 1998
- Best result: (3) 2002, 2006, 2014

Sitting Volleyball European Championships
- Appearances: 11 since 1995
- Best result: (12) 1999, 2001, 2003, 2005, 2007, 2009, 2011, 2013, 2015, 2021, 2023, 2025
- Website: ssobih.org (in Bosnian)

The Bosnia and Herzegovina men's national sitting volleyball team (Bosnian: Reprezentacija Bosne i Hercegovine u sjedećoj odbojci; Croatian: Reprezenacija Bosne i Hercegovine u sjedećoj odbojci; Serbian: Репрезентација Босне и Херцеговине у сједећој одбојци) represents Bosnia and Herzegovina in international sitting volleyball competitions and friendly matches. Bosnia is one of the dominant forces in sitting volleyball worldwide, alongside Iran. The team won a bronze medal, during ECVD European Championships in 1997 in Tallinn. It took nearly two decades later for the nation to win a medal outside the sport of sitting volleyball when Amel Tuka won bronze during 2015 World Championships in Athletics.

The team is the most decorated in Bosnia and Herzegovina sport having won 2 paralympic volleyball gold medals, 4 paralympic silver medals, 3 World Cup titles, and 9 won European Championships straight. The team won World titles and European titles either side of winning Paralympics Gold in 2004 Athens. The team is a member of the world (WOVD) and European (ECVD) sitting volleyball governing bodies.

It is governed by the Association of sitting volleyball of Bosnia and Herzegovina (Savez sjedeće odbojke BiH). Until 1992, Bosnian players like Ševko Nuhanović were part of the Yugoslav national sitting volleyball team.

== History ==
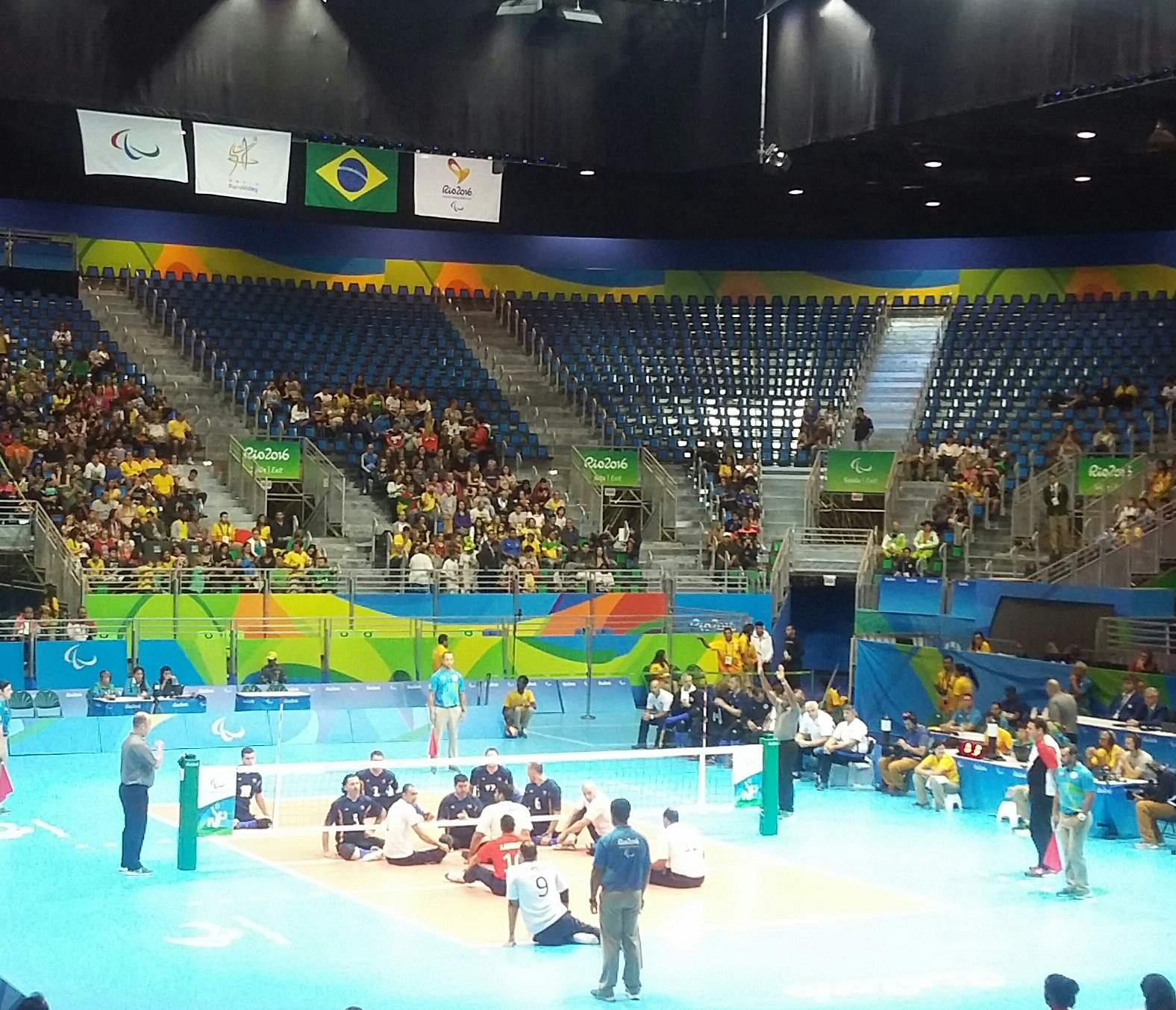
Bosnia and Herzegovina national sitting volleyball team at the 2016 Summer Paralympics

Prior to 1992, during the Yugoslavia days, the team started to take shape. Players were part of Sarajevo based Uporni Sitting Volleyball Club which were champions of Yugoslavia three times in a row. The Bosnia and Herzegovina men's sitting volleyball team includes athletes who were deeply affected by the Bosnian War (6 April 1992 – 14 December 1995). Due to the large number of people injured in the conflict, the country started to invest more in Paralympic sports. Captain Sabahudin Delalić fought for the Bosnian army and lost part of his right leg after a wall fell on him. Safet Alibašić lost one of his legs when he stepped on a landmine.

The team's first major tournament participation was the 1995 European championship. During its qualification phase in early December 1994, the team (all players from Sarajevo club SDI Spid), traveled to Zagreb on a bus riddled with bullet holes in temperatures of 17 degrees below zero. Bosnia along with Austria were the only nations to travel to play Croatia in the qualification tournament (out of 11 invited). Croatia finished undefeated with victories over Austria 3:0 (15:5, 15:8, 16:14) and Bosnia (15:6, 15:8, 15:11). Bosnia beat Austria, however all 3 nations qualified for the finals.

The team made their Paralympic Games debut at Sydney 2000 and won silver. There have been seven total Paralympic podium finishes in sitting volleyball for Bosnia and Herzegovina. They were the only medals in Olympic and Paralympic Games as an independent nation (from Yugoslavia) until Ismail Barlov's silver in 50m breaststroke para swimming in 2024. The 800 metres distance runner Amel Tuka holds another prestigious medal for Bosnia and Herzegovina, a bronze at 2015 World Championships in Athletics in Beijing.

On 21 June 2014, Edin Džeko congratulated the BiH men's national sitting volleyball team after they won 2014 Sitting Volleyball World Championships title, stating "You are our pride and inspiration".

On 10 September 2012, Basketball Federation of Bosnia and Herzegovina congratulated the BiH sitting volleyball team upon their paralympic gold medal win at 2012 Summer Paralympics in London, saying "You are a pride of our nation", as did NFSBiH (normalization committee) with Ivica Osim at the head.

Success formula

Height, experience and a strong club league are key to success in sitting volleyball. 80% of the Bosnian national team players come from Sarajevo based and Europe's top two sitting volleyball club sides; SDI Spid and OKI Fantomi. Height was a critical aspect of success for the Iranian national team winning gold over Bosnia at the Rio 2016 Paralympics due to the height advantage of tallest Paralympian Morteza Mehrzadselakjani at 2.46m (8ft 1in), giving his team an advantage in his ability to both block at the net and fire over returns from a much higher trajectory. In the Rio final, Mehrzadselakjani was top scorer for Iran with 28 points. Safet Alibašić top scored for BIH with 16 points and the fastest serve came from Adnan Manko at 68 km/h. Sport investment, financial backing and sprint velocities are other key factors.

Style of play

Bosnia plays an attacking style of volleyball.

Nickname

A popular nickname for Bosnian sport players and/or teams is the Zmajevi or Dragons in English alluding to the famous Bosnian general Husein Gradaščević who fought for Bosnian independence and who was known as the "Dragon of Bosnia". In foreign media, they are sometimes referred to as the Golden Lilies, in reference to the golden lily featured on the coat of arms of the influential Bosnian medieval Kotromanić dynasty.

Sponsorship

The team is sponsored by Sarajevo based telecommunication company BH Telecom d.d. since 1996.

== Honours ==
=== Seniors Competitive record ===
==== Paralympic Games ====
Year	Rank	Pld	Wins	Loss	Set F	Set A
Part of Yugoslavia
(Netherlands) 1980 Arnhem	(bronze) Bronze	5	3	2	10	9
(United States) 1984 New York	5th place	5	3	2	11	7
(South Korea) 1988 Seoul	4th place	6	3	3	13	12
Total		16	9	7	34	28
as Bosnia and Herzegovina
(Spain) 1992 Barcelona	Did not enter	–	–	–	–	–
(United States) 1996 Atlanta	Did not qualify	–	–	–	–	–
(Australia) 2000 Sydney	Silver	8	5	3	15	11
(Greece) 2004 Athens	Gold	6	6	0	18	2
(China) 2008 Beijing	Silver	5	4	1	12	4
(United Kingdom) 2012 London	Gold	7	6	1	19	4
(Brazil) 2016 Rio	Silver	5	3	2	10	6
(Japan) 2020 Tokyo	Bronze	5	3	2	9	7
(France) 2024 Paris	Silver	5	4	1	13	6
Total	2 Titles	41	31	10	96	40

==== World Para Volleyball Championship ====
Year	Rank	Pld	Wins	Loss	Set F	Set A
Part of Yugoslavia
(Netherlands) 1983 Delden	5th place	–	–	–	–	–
(Norway) 1985 Kristiansand	Runners-up	–	–	–	–	–
(Hungary) 1986 Pécs	4th place	–	–	–	–	–
(United States) 1989 Las Vegas	Did not enter	–	–	–	–	–
(Netherlands) 1990 Assen	3rd place	–	–	–	–	–
Total		–	–	–	–	–
as Bosnia and Herzegovina
(Germany) 1994 Bottrop	Did not enter	–	–	–	–	–
(Iran) 1998 Tehran	3rd place	8	7	1	23	4
(Egypt) 2002 Cairo	Champions	7	6	1	19	3
(Netherlands) 2006 Roermond	Champions	8	8	0	24	2
(United States) 2010 Edmond	Runners-up	7	6	1	20	4
(Poland) 2014 Elbląg	Champions	6	6	0	18	2
(Netherlands) 2018 Hague	Runners-up	6	5	1	15	5
(Bosnia and Herzegovina) 2022 Sarajevo	Runners-up	7	6	1	18	4
(China) 2026 Hangzhou	Runners-up	7	5	2	17	8
Total	3 Titles	56	49	7	154	32

==== European Championships ====
Year	Rank	Pld	Wins	Loss	Set F	Set A
Part of Yugoslavia
(Germany) 1981 Bonn	5th place	–	–	–	–	–
(Socialist Federal Republic of Yugoslavia) 1987 Sarajevo	Runners-up	–	–	–	–	–
(United Kingdom) 1991 Nottingham	–	–	–	–	–	–
Total		–	–	–	–	–
as Bosnia and Herzegovina
(Finland) 1993 Järvenpää	Did not enter	–	–	–	–	–
(Slovenia) 1995 Ljubljana	11th place					
(Estonia) 1997 Tallinn	3rd place					
(Bosnia and Herzegovina) 1999 Sarajevo	Champions	5	5	0	15	0
(Hungary) 2001 Sárospatak	Champions	5	5	0	15	1
(Finland) 2003 Lappeenranta	Champions	5	5	0	15	1
(Germany) 2005 Leverkusen	Champions	7	7	0	21	1
(Hungary) 2007 Nyíregyháza	Champions	7	7	0	21	4
(Poland) 2009 Elbląg	Champions	6	6	0	18	1
(Netherlands) 2011 Rotterdam	Champions	7	7	0	21	2
(Poland) 2013 Elbląg	Champions	5	5	0	15	0
(Germany) 2015 Warendorf	Champions	6	6	0	18	0
(Croatia) 2017 Poreč	3rd place	6*	5	1	17	3
(Hungary) 2019 Budapest	Runners-up	8	7	1	24	2
(Turkey) 2021 Kemer	Champions	7	7	0	21	1
(Italy) 2023 Caorle	Champions	8	8	0	24	2
(Hungary) 2025 Győr	Champions	8	8	0	24	0
Total	12 Titles	82	80	2	245	18

- Bosnia played 1 extra opponent in group stage of 2017 championship while Russia/Ukraine/Croatia (other semi-final sides) played 1 less.

==== Minor tournaments ====
Note: WOVD Intercontinental Cup tournaments serve as Paralympic qualifiers.
In 2005 Sarajevo competition; club Sdi Spid faced Iran in the final.

Year	Tournament	Position
(Bosnia and Herzegovina) 2005 Sarajevo	WOVD World Cup	Clubs entered
(Egypt) 2008 Ismailia	WOVD Intercontinental Cup	3rd place
(Egypt) 2010 Port Said	WOVD World Cup	Did not enter
(England) 2011 Kettering	Continental Cup	Champions
(Egypt) 2012 Cairo	WOVD Intercontinental Cup	Did not enter
(China) 2016 Anji	WOVD Intercontinental Cup	Did not enter
(Iran) 2018 Tabriz	Men's World Super 6	3rd place

=== Juniors Competitive record ===
==== Junior World Championships ====
Year	Position
as Bosnia and Herzegovina
(Slovenia) 2005 Kamnik	Runners-up
(Brazil) 2007 Niterói	4th place
(Iran) 2009 Mashhad	Did not enter

==== Junior European Championships ====
Year	Position
as Bosnia and Herzegovina
(Hungary) 2006 Nyíregyháza	Runners-up
(Germany) 2008 Leverkusen	Runners-up
(Ukraine) 2010 Yevpatoria	N/A –

== Coaches ==
=== Coaching staff ===
Position	Name	Active
Head coach	(Bosnia and Herzegovina) Ifet Mahmutović	2021–present
Assistant coach	(Bosnia and Herzegovina) Ejub Mehmedović	1996–present
Co-Trainer	(Bosnia and Herzegovina) Zikret Mahmutović	1996–present
Team manager	(Bosnia and Herzegovina) Miralem Zubović	1996–?
Team Economist	(Bosnia and Herzegovina) Dževad Šabeta	1996–present

== Players ==
Players rosters

Players called up for 2016 Summer Paralympics:

Head coach: Mirza Hrustemović

No.	Name	Date of birth	Position	2016 club
1	Ismet Godinjak	17 March 1973	UN	(Bosnia and Herzegovina) OKI Fantomi
2	Adnan Manko	16 January 1977	UN	(Bosnia and Herzegovina) KSO Spid
4	Adnan Kešmer	11 October 1986	L	(Bosnia and Herzegovina) KSO Spid
5	Asim Medić	3 August 1969	UN	(Bosnia and Herzegovina) KSO Spid
6	Mirzet Duran	13 October 1986	UN	(Bosnia and Herzegovina) OKI Fantomi
7	Nizam Čančar	17 September 1975	UN	(Bosnia and Herzegovina) KSO Spid
8	Dževad Hamzić	4 September 1968	UN	(Bosnia and Herzegovina) KSO Spid
9	Benis Kadrić	28 January 1987	UN	(Bosnia and Herzegovina) OKI Fantomi
10	Safet Alibašić	21 December 1982	UN	(Bosnia and Herzegovina) OKI Fantomi
11	Sabahudin Delalić	17 August 1972	UN	(Bosnia and Herzegovina) KSO Spid
12	Ermin Jusufović	31 May 1981	M	(Bosnia and Herzegovina) SKISO "Sinovi Bosne"
13	Armin Šehić	11 May 1994	M	(Bosnia and Herzegovina) KSO Spid

Players called up for 2015 European Championships:

Sabahudin Delalić (captain), Dževad Hamzić, Asim Medić, Safet Alibašić, Beniz Kadrić, Ermin Jusufović, Muhamed Kapetanović, Nizam Čančar, Ismet Godinjak, Adnan Manko, Mirzet Duran, Adnan Kešmer, Edin Džino, Armin Šehić, Jasmin Brkić, Adin Likić, Damir Grbić.

Players called up for 2012 Summer Paralympics:

The following is the Bosnian roster in the men's volleyball tournament of the 2012 Summer Paralympics.

Head coach: Mirza Hrustemović

№	Name	Date of birth	Position	2012 club
1	Ismet Godinjak	17 March 1973	UN	(Bosnia and Herzegovina) OKI Fantomi
2	Adnan Manko	16 January 1977	UN	(Bosnia and Herzegovina) OKI Fantomi
4	Adnan Kešmer	11 October 1986	L	(Bosnia and Herzegovina) OKI Fantomi
5	Asim Medić	3 August 1969	UN	(Bosnia and Herzegovina) Sdi Spid
6	Mirzet Duran	13 October 1986	UN	(Bosnia and Herzegovina) OKI Fantomi
7	Nizam Čančar	17 September 1975	UN	(Bosnia and Herzegovina) OKI Fantomi
8	Dževad Hamzić	4 September 1968	UN	(Bosnia and Herzegovina) Sdi Spid
9	Benis Kadrić	28 January 1987	UN	(Bosnia and Herzegovina) OKI Fantomi
10	Safet Alibašić	21 December 1982	UN	(Bosnia and Herzegovina) Sdi Spid
11	Sabahudin Delalić	17 August 1972	UN	(Bosnia and Herzegovina) Sdi Spid
12	Ermin Jusufović	31 May 1981	M	(Bosnia and Herzegovina) SKISO "Sinovi Bosne"

Players called up for 2008 Summer Paralympics:

Safet Alibašić, Sabahudin Delalić (captain), Mirzet Duran, Esad Durmišević, Ismet Godinjak, Dževad Hamzić, Ermin Jusufović, Hidaet Jusufović (libero), Zikret Mahmić, Adnan Manko, Asim Medić, Ejub Mehmedović.

Players called up for 2004 Summer Paralympics:

Dževad Hamzić, Nedzad Salkić, Safet Alibašić, Sabahudin Delalić, Ermin Jusufović, Zikret Mahmić, Fikret Causević, Asim Medić, Esad Durmisević, Ejub Mehmedović, Adnan Manko, Ismet Godinjak.

Players called up for 2000 Summer Paralympics:

Dževad Hamzić, Nedžad Salkić, Abid Čišija, Sabahudin Delalić, Nevzet Alić, Zikret Mahmić, Fikret Čausević, Asim Medić, Edin Ibraković, Ševko Nuhanović, Adnan Manko, Ismet Godinjak.

The players in the B&H national side predominantly are selected from two biggest clubs from Bosnia and Herzegovina:KSO Spid Sarajevo and OKI Fantomi Sarajevo (Volleyball Club Invalids Phantoms). The sitting volleyball clubs started by gathering mostly war veterans handicapped during Bosnian War. Both clubs are multiple league champions at home.

=== KSO Spid ===
KSO Spid was founded on 5 April 1994.

- Bosnia and Herzegovina Sitting Volleyball Championship:
  - Winners (21): 1994, 1995, 1997, 1998, 1999, 2000, 2001, 2003, 2004, 2005, 2007, 2010, 2011, 2012, 2013, 2014, 2015, 2016, 2017, 2018, 2019, 2020.
  - Runners-Up (4): 2002, 2006, 2008, 2009.
- Bosnia and Herzegovina Sitting Volleyball National Cup:
  - Winners (2): 1999, 2000.
- Sitting Volleyball Champions League:
  - Winners (7): 2000, 2001, 2002, 2003, 2005, 2006, 2010
  - Runners-Up (4): 1998, 1999, 2004, 2007.
  - 3rd Place (1): 2008.
- Sitting Volleyball World Club Championship:
  - Runners-Up (2): 2003, 2005.
- Sitting Volleyball Sarajevo Open:
  - Winners (1): 2004.

=== OKI Fantomi ===
OKI "Phantom" were established in 1995 in Sarajevo.

- Bosnia and Herzegovina Sitting Volleyball Championship:
  - Winners (5): 1996, 2002, 2006, 2008, 2009
  - Runners-Up (8): 1997, 1999, 2000, 2001, 2003, 2005, 2007, 2012.
- Bosnia and Herzegovina Sitting Volleyball National Cup:
  - Winners (1): 2009
- Sitting Volleyball Champions League:
  - Winners (3): 2004, 2007, 2008.
  - Runners-Up (4): 2003, 2005, 2006, 2011.
  - 3rd Place (1): 2001.
- Sitting Volleyball Sarajevo Open:
  - Winners (12): 2002, 2003, 2006, 2007, 2008, 2009, 2010, 2011, 2012, 2014, 2015, 2016.
  - Runners-Up (3): 2004, 2005, 2013.

==== Sarajevo Open ====
Organised annually by OKI Fantomi volleyball club, Sarajevo Open has grown into a tournament of prestige for national teams and elite club sides.

Sarajevo Open	Gold medal game			Bronze medal game		
Sarajevo Open	Gold	Score	Silver	Bronze	Score	Fourth place
2002	(Bosnia and Herzegovina) OKI "FANTOMI" Sarajevo (1)		(Croatia) SDI HRABRI Zagreb	(Slovenia) Paras Ljubljana		(Bosnia and Herzegovina) Banja Luka
2003	(Bosnia and Herzegovina) OKI "FANTOMI" Sarajevo (2)	3:0	(Hungary) PIREMON SE			
2004	(Bosnia and Herzegovina) SDI Spid Sarajevo (1 title)	3:0	(Bosnia and Herzegovina) OKI "FANTOMI" Sarajevo			
2005	Iran (National team) (1)	3:0	(Bosnia and Herzegovina) OKI "FANTOMI" Sarajevo			
2006	(Bosnia and Herzegovina) OKI "FANTOMI" Sarajevo (3)	3:0	Egypt (National team)			
2007	(Bosnia and Herzegovina) OKI "FANTOMI" Sarajevo (4)	3:2	(Russia) AVS Rodnik	Germany (National team)	3:1	Croatia (National team)
2008	(Bosnia and Herzegovina) OKI "FANTOMI" Sarajevo (5)	3:0	Russia (National team)	(Iran) Mazanderan	3:1	(Hungary) PIREMON SE
2009	(Bosnia and Herzegovina) OKI "FANTOMI" Sarajevo (6)	3:0	Germany (National team)	Russia (National team)	3:0	Brazil (National team)
2010	(Bosnia and Herzegovina) OKI "FANTOMI" Sarajevo (7)	3:1	Iran (National team)	Russia (National team)	3:0	Germany (National team)
2011	(Bosnia and Herzegovina) OKI "FANTOMI" Sarajevo (8)	3:0	Russia (National team)	(Croatia) SDI "HRABRI"	3:0	(Germany) TSV "BAYER 04" LEVERKUSEN
2012	(Bosnia and Herzegovina) OKI "FANTOMI" Sarajevo (9)	3:1	Russia (National team)	(Bosnia and Herzegovina) "ČELIK '07" Zenica	3:2	Germany (National team)
2013	Russia (National team) (1)	3:1	(Bosnia and Herzegovina) OKI "FANTOMI" Sarajevo	Brazil (National team)	3:0	Netherlands (National team)
2014	(Bosnia and Herzegovina) OKI "FANTOMI" Sarajevo (10)	3:0	Russia (National team)	Brazil (National team)	3:1	Germany (National team)
2015	(Bosnia and Herzegovina) OKI "FANTOMI" Sarajevo (11)	3:1	Brazil (National team)	Russia (National team)	3:0	(Germany) BAYER
2016	(Bosnia and Herzegovina) OKI "FANTOMI" Sarajevo (12)	3:1	Russia (National team)	Germany (National team)	3:0	Egypt (National team)
2017	Russia (National team) (2)	3:1	(Bosnia and Herzegovina) OKI "FANTOMI" Sarajevo	Azerbaijan (National team)	3:0	(Bosnia and Herzegovina) OKI "ILIDŽA" Sarajevo

International trust fund for demining and mine victims assistance (ITF) is a sponsor of OKI "FANTOMI" Sarajevo and Sarajevo Open.

== Results ==
All-time team results

1994–1999

Date	Competition	Round	Venue	Team 1	Result	Team 2
2 July 1995	1995 European Championships	Group	Ljubljana, Slovenia	Bosnia and Herzegovina	0:3 Set 1: (??:25); Set 2: (??:25); Set 3: (??:25)	Germany
3 July 1995	1995 European Championships	Group stage	Ljubljana, Slovenia	Bosnia and Herzegovina	0:3	Netherlands
11 April 1998	1998 World Championships	Group stage	Tehran, Iran	Bosnia and Herzegovina	3:0	N/A
1998	1998 World Championships	Group stage	Tehran, Iran	Bosnia and Herzegovina	3:0	N/A
1998	1998 World Championships	Group stage	Tehran, Iran	Bosnia and Herzegovina	3:0	N/A
1998	1998 World Championships	Group stage	Tehran, Iran	Bosnia and Herzegovina	3:0	N/A
1998	1998 World Championships	Group stage	Tehran, Iran	Bosnia and Herzegovina	3:0	N/A
1998	1998 World Championships	QF	Tehran, Iran	Bosnia and Herzegovina	3:0	N/A
1998	1998 World Championships	SF	Tehran, Iran	Bosnia and Herzegovina	2:3	Finland
17 April 1998	1998 World Championships	3rd place playoff	Tehran, Iran	Bosnia and Herzegovina	3:1	Netherlands
12 September 1999	1999 European Championships EPSO BiH 99	Group B	Sarajevo, Bosnia	Bosnia and Herzegovina	3:0	Poland
13 September 1999	1999 European Championships	Group B	Sarajevo, Bosnia	Bosnia and Herzegovina	3:0	Russia
14 September 1999	1999 European Championships	QF	Sarajevo, Bosnia	Bosnia and Herzegovina	3:0	Croatia
15 September 1999	1999 European Championships	SF	Sarajevo, Bosnia	Bosnia and Herzegovina	3:0	Finland
17 September 1999	1999 European Championships	Final	Sarajevo, Bosnia	Bosnia and Herzegovina	3:0	Germany

2000–2009

Date	Competition	Round	Venue	Team 1	Result	Team 2
October 2000	2000 Summer Paralympics	Group B	Sydney, Australia	Egypt	3:0	Bosnia and Herzegovina
20 October 2000	2000 Summer Paralympics	Group B	Sydney, Australia	Finland	1:3	Bosnia and Herzegovina
October 2000	2000 Summer Paralympics	Group B	Sydney, Australia	Bosnia and Herzegovina	0:3	Libya
October 2000	2000 Summer Paralympics	Group B	Sydney, Australia	Bosnia and Herzegovina	3:0	(South Korea) Korea Republic
October 2000	2000 Summer Paralympics	Group B	Sydney, Australia	Australia	0:3	Bosnia and Herzegovina
October 2000	2000 Summer Paralympics	QF	Sydney, Australia	Germany	1:3	Bosnia and Herzegovina
October 2000	2000 Summer Paralympics	SF	Sydney, Australia	Bosnia and Herzegovina	3:0	Egypt
28 October 2000	2000 Summer Paralympics	Final	Sydney, Australia	Iran	3:0	Bosnia and Herzegovina
August 2001	2001 European Championships	Final	Sárospatak, Hungary	Germany	1:3	Bosnia and Herzegovina
26 September 2002	2002 World Championships	Group B	Cairo, Egypt	Egypt	3:1	Bosnia and Herzegovina
October 2002	2002 World Championships	Group B	Cairo, Egypt	Morocco	0:3	Bosnia and Herzegovina
October 2002	2002 World Championships	Group B	Cairo, Egypt	Bosnia and Herzegovina	3:0	Netherlands
October 2002	2002 World Championships	Group B	Cairo, Egypt	Bosnia and Herzegovina	3:0	Germany
October 2002	2002 World Championships	QF	Cairo, Egypt	Bosnia and Herzegovina	3:0	Hungary
October 2002	2002 World Championships	SF	Cairo, Egypt	Iran	0:3	Bosnia and Herzegovina
4 October 2002	2002 World Championships	Final	Cairo, Egypt	Bosnia and Herzegovina	3:0	Germany
28 August 2003	2003 European Championships	Group stage	Lappeenranta, Finland	Bosnia and Herzegovina	3:0	Hungary
28 August 2003	2003 European Championships	Group stage	Lappeenranta, Finland	Finland	1:3 Set 1: (26:24); Set 2: (13:25); Set 3: (20:25); Set 4: (18:25)	Bosnia and Herzegovina
28 August 2003	2003 European Championships	QF	Lappeenranta, Finland	Latvia	0:3 Set 1: (8:25); Set 2: (12:25); Set 3: (12:25)	Bosnia and Herzegovina
29 August 2003	2003 European Championships	SF	Lappeenranta, Finland	Russia	0:3	Bosnia and Herzegovina
30 August 2003	2003 European Championships	Final	Lappeenranta, Finland	Bosnia and Herzegovina	3:0 Set 1: (25:21); Set 2: (25:18); Set 3: (25:12)	Germany
21 September 2004	2004 Summer Paralympics	Group B	Athens, Greece	Greece	0:3	Bosnia and Herzegovina
22 September 2004	2004 Summer Paralympics	Group B	Athens, Greece	Bosnia and Herzegovina	3:0	Egypt
23 September 2004	2004 Summer Paralympics	Group B	Athens, Greece	Bosnia and Herzegovina	3:0	United States
24 September 2004	2004 Summer Paralympics	QF	Athens, Greece	Japan	0:3	Bosnia and Herzegovina
25 September 2004	2004 Summer Paralympics	SF	Athens, Greece	Germany	2:3	Bosnia and Herzegovina
27 September 2004	2004 Summer Paralympics	Final	Athens, Greece	Bosnia and Herzegovina	3:2 Set 1: (25:23); Set 2: (20:25); Set 3: (20:25); Set 4: (27:25); Set 5: (15:10)	Iran
21 June 2005	2005 European Championships	Group A	Leverkusen, Germany	Bosnia and Herzegovina	3:0 Set 1: (25:10); Set 2: (25:9); Set 3: (25:14)	Poland
22 June 2005	2005 European Championships	Group A	Leverkusen, Germany	Bosnia and Herzegovina	3:0 Set 1: (25:13); Set 2: (25:10); Set 3: (25:20)	Hungary
22 June 2005	2005 European Championships	Group A	Leverkusen, Germany	Bosnia and Herzegovina	3:0 Set 1: (25:7); Set 2: (25:6); Set 3: (25:7)	Greece
23 June 2005	2005 European Championships	Group A	Leverkusen, Germany	Bosnia and Herzegovina	3:0 Set 1: (25:6); Set 2: (25:14); Set 3: (25:17)	Serbia and Montenegro
23 June 2005	2005 European Championships	Group A	Leverkusen, Germany	Bosnia and Herzegovina	3:1 Set 1: (25:16); Set 2: (25:18); Set 3: (29:31); Set 4: (25:17)	Russia
25 June 2005	2005 European Championships	SF	Leverkusen, Germany	Bosnia and Herzegovina	3:0 Set 1: (25:10); Set 2: (25:6); Set 3: (25:9)	Croatia
27 June 2005	2005 European Championships	Final	Leverkusen, Germany	Germany	0:3 Set 1: (21:25); Set 2: (14:25); Set 3: (21:25)	Bosnia and Herzegovina
18 June 2006	2006 World Championships	Group A	Roermond, Netherlands	Brazil	0:3 Set 1: (14:25); Set 2: (5:25); Set 3: (13:25)	Bosnia and Herzegovina
19 June 2006	2006 World Championships	Group A	Roermond, Netherlands	Bosnia and Herzegovina	3:0 Set 1: (25:20); Set 2: (25:18); Set 3: (25:10)	Germany
19 June 2006	2006 World Championships	Group A	Roermond, Netherlands	Bosnia and Herzegovina	3:0 Set 1: (25:18); Set 2: (25:20); Set 3: (25:15)	United States
21 June 2006	2006 World Championships	Group A	Roermond, Netherlands	Bosnia and Herzegovina	3:1	Russia
21 June 2006	2006 World Championships	Group A	Roermond, Netherlands	Bosnia and Herzegovina	3:0 Set 1: (25:17); Set 2: (25:22); Set 3: (25:20)	Croatia
22 June 2006	2006 World Championships	QF	Roermond, Netherlands	Netherlands	0:3 Set 1: (10:25); Set 2: (14:25); Set 3: (20:25)	Bosnia and Herzegovina
23 June 2006	2006 World Championships	SF	Roermond, Netherlands	Bosnia and Herzegovina	3:0 Set 1: (25:23); Set 2: (25:19); Set 3: (25:20)	Egypt
25 June 2006	2006 World Championships	Final	Roermond, Netherlands	Iran	1:3 Set 1: (20:25); Set 2: (25:23); Set 3: (23:25); Set 4: (16:25)	Bosnia and Herzegovina
23 August 2007	Friendly		Berlin, Germany	Germany	1:3	Bosnia and Herzegovina
4 September 2007	2007 European Championships	Group stage	Nyíregyháza, Hungary	Bosnia and Herzegovina	3:0 Set 1: (25:20); Set 2: (25:9); Set 3: (25:23)	Croatia
5 September 2007	2007 European Championships	Group stage	Nyíregyháza, Hungary	Bosnia and Herzegovina	3:0 Set 1: (25:6); Set 2: (25:15); Set 3: (25:16)	Latvia
5 September 2007	2007 European Championships	Group stage	Nyíregyháza, Hungary	Bosnia and Herzegovina	3:0 Set 1: (25:4); Set 2: (25:15); Set 3: (25:10)	(United Kingdom) Great Britain
6 September 2007	2007 European Championships	Group stage	Nyíregyháza, Hungary	Hungary	0:3 Set 1: (8:25); Set 2: (10:25); Set 3: (17:25)	Bosnia and Herzegovina
6 September 2007	2007 European Championships	Group stage	Nyíregyháza, Hungary	Bosnia and Herzegovina	3:0 Set 1: (25:4); Set 2: (25:5); Set 3: (25:6)	Greece
7 September 2007	2007 European Championships	SF	Nyíregyháza, Hungary	Bosnia and Herzegovina	3:2 Set 1: (17:25); Set 2: (25:18); Set 3: (22:25); Set 4: (25:17); Set 5: (15:12)	Germany
8 September 2007	2007 European Championships	Final	Nyíregyháza, Hungary	Russia	2:3 Set 1: (20:25); Set 2: (17:25); Set 3: (25:18); Set 4: (25:21); Set 5: (7:15)	Bosnia and Herzegovina
29 April 2008	2008 WOVD Intercontinental Cup	3rd Place playoff	Ismailia, Egypt	Egypt	1:3 Set 1: (18:25); Set 2: (25:21); Set 3: (21:25); Set 4: (23:25)	Bosnia and Herzegovina
7 September 2008	2008 Summer Paralympics	Group A	Beijing, China	China	0:3 Set 1: (14:25); Set 2: (22:25); Set 3: (17:25)	Bosnia and Herzegovina
September 2008	2008 Summer Paralympics	Group A	Beijing, China	Bosnia and Herzegovina	3:0 Set 1: (25:6); Set 2: (25:14); Set 3: (25:16)	Iraq
September 2008	2008 Summer Paralympics	Group A	Beijing, China	Russia	1:3 Set 1: (21:25); Set 2: (22:25); Set 3: (25:18); Set 4: (16:25)	Bosnia and Herzegovina
September 2008	2008 Summer Paralympics	SF	Beijing, China	Bosnia and Herzegovina	3:0 Set 1: (25:18); Set 2: (25:21); Set 3: (25:20)	Egypt
15 September 2008	2008 Summer Paralympics	Final	Beijing, China	Iran	3:0 Set 1: (25:22); Set 2: (25:18); Set 3: (25:22)	Bosnia and Herzegovina
21 November 2009	2009 European Championships	Group B	Elbląg, Poland	Bosnia and Herzegovina	3:0 Set 1: (25:15); Set 2: (25:23); Set 3: (25:14)	Russia
23 November 2009	2009 European Championships	Group B	Elbląg, Poland	Bosnia and Herzegovina	3:0 Set 1: (25:18); Set 2: (25:13); Set 3: (25:11)	Netherlands
23 November 2009	2009 European Championships	Group B	Elbląg, Poland	Bosnia and Herzegovina	3:0 Set 1: (25:8); Set 2: (25:20); Set 3: (25:13)	Serbia
24 November 2009	2009 European Championships	Group B	Elbląg, Poland	Bosnia and Herzegovina	3:0 Set 1: (25:13); Set 2: (25:8); Set 3: (25:18)	Poland
24 November 2009	2009 European Championships	SF	Elbląg, Poland	Bosnia and Herzegovina	3:0 Set 1: (25:22); Set 2: (25:14); Set 3: (25:14)	Germany
25 November 2009	2009 European Championships	Final	Elbląg, Poland	Bosnia and Herzegovina	3:1 Set 1: (20:25); Set 2: (25:12); Set 3: (25:21); Set 4: (25:18)	Russia

2010–present

Date	Competition	Round	Venue	Team 1	Result	Team 2
12 July 2010	2010 World Championships	Group A	Edmond, United States of America	Bosnia and Herzegovina	3:0 Set 1: (25:8); Set 2: (25:7); Set 3: (25:10)	Libya
13 July 2010	2010 World Championships	Group A	Edmond, United States of America	United States	0:3 Set 1: (15:25); Set 2: (15:25); Set 3: (10:25)	Bosnia and Herzegovina
14 July 2010	2010 World Championships	Group A	Edmond, United States of America	Bosnia and Herzegovina	3:0 Set 1: (25:14); Set 2: (25:8); Set 3: (25:18)	Canada
15 July 2010	2010 World Championships	Group A	Edmond, United States of America	Bosnia and Herzegovina	3:0	China
15 July 2010	2010 World Championships	QF	Edmond, United States of America	Bosnia and Herzegovina	3:0 Set 1: (25:22); Set 2: (25:15); Set 3: (25:23)	Brazil
17 July 2010	2010 World Championships	SF	Edmond, United States of America	Bosnia and Herzegovina	3:1 Set 1: (25:16); Set 2: (25:20); Set 3: (22:25); Set 4: (25:18)	Russia
18 July 2010	2010 World Championships	Final	Edmond, United States	Iran	3:2 Set 1: (25:17); Set 2: (25:21); Set 3: (18:25); Set 4: (19:25); Set 5: (15:11)	Bosnia and Herzegovina
11 July 2011	2011 ECVD Continental Cup	Pool A	Kettering, United Kingdom	Kazakhstan	0:3 Set 1: (11:25); Set 2: (8:25); Set 3: (11:25)	Bosnia and Herzegovina
July 2011	2011 Continental Cup	Pool A	Kettering, UK	Brazil	0:3 Set 1: (11:25); Set 2: (15:25); Set 3: (22:25)	Bosnia and Herzegovina
July 2011	2011 Continental Cup	Pool A	Kettering, UK	Bosnia and Herzegovina	3:0 Set 1: (25:17); Set 2: (25:9); Set 3: (25:13)	Canada
13 July 2011	2011 Continental Cup	Pool A	Kettering, UK	(United Kingdom) Great Britain	0:3 Set 1: (9:25); Set 2: (6:25); Set 3: (16:25)	Bosnia and Herzegovina
July 2011	2011 Continental Cup	Pool A	Kettering, UK	Bosnia and Herzegovina	?:?	Ukraine
July 2011	2011 Continental Cup	QF	Kettering, UK	Bosnia and Herzegovina	?:?	China
July 2011	2011 Continental Cup	SF	Kettering, UK	Bosnia and Herzegovina	3:0 Set 1: (25:20); Set 2: (25:11); Set 3: (25:23)	Brazil
16 July 2011	2011 Continental Cup	Final	Kettering, United Kingdom	Bosnia and Herzegovina	3:0 Set 1: (25:11); Set 2: (30:28); Set 3: (25:18)	Egypt
10 October 2011	2011 European Championships	Group A	Rotterdam, Netherlands	Bosnia and Herzegovina	3:0 Set 1: (25:20); Set 2: (25:11); Set 3: (25:16)	Serbia
October 2011	2011 European Championships	Group A	Rotterdam, Netherlands	Bosnia and Herzegovina	3:0 Set 1: (25:5); Set 2: (25:14); Set 3: (25:12)	Croatia
October 2011	2011 European Championships	Group A	Rotterdam, Netherlands	Bosnia and Herzegovina	3:0 Set 1: (25:6); Set 2: (25:19); Set 3: (25:11)	Latvia
October 2011	2011 European Championships	Group A	Rotterdam, Netherlands	Bosnia and Herzegovina	3:0 Set 1: (27:25); Set 2: (25:22); Set 3: (25:23)	Russia
13 October 2011	2011 European Championships	QF	Rotterdam, Netherlands	Bosnia and Herzegovina	3:0 Set 1: (25:13); Set 2: (25:11); Set 3: (25:12)	Poland
13 October 2011	2011 European Championships	SF	Rotterdam, Netherlands	Bosnia and Herzegovina	3:1 Set 1: (25:20); Set 2: (25:16); Set 3: (26:28); Set 4: (26:24)	Ukraine
15 October 2011	2011 European Championships	Final	Rotterdam, Netherlands	Bosnia and Herzegovina	3:1 Set 1: (22:25); Set 2: (25:23); Set 3: (25:10); Set 4: (25:23)	Russia
30 August 2012	2012 Summer Paralympics	Group B	London, United Kingdom	Bosnia and Herzegovina	3:0 Set 1: (26:24); Set 2: (25:21); Set 3: (25:17)	China
1 September 2012	2012 Summer Paralympics	Group B	London, United Kingdom	Bosnia and Herzegovina	3:0 Set 1: (25:14); Set 2: (25:21); Set 3: (25:19)	Brazil
3 September 2012	2012 Summer Paralympics	Group B	London, United Kingdom	Bosnia and Herzegovina	3:0 Set 1: (25:7); Set 2: (25:12); Set 3: (25:8)	Rwanda
4 September 2012	2012 Summer Paralympics	Group B	London, United Kingdom	Bosnia and Herzegovina	1:3 Set 1: (25:22); Set 2: (18:25); Set 3: (18:25); Set 4: (22:25)	Iran
5 September 2012	2012 Summer Paralympics	QF	London, United Kingdom	Bosnia and Herzegovina	3:0 Set 1: (25:17); Set 2: (25:16); Set 3: (25:22)	Egypt
6 September 2012	2012 Summer Paralympics	SF	London, United Kingdom	Bosnia and Herzegovina	3:0 Set 1: (25:19); Set 2: (25:20); Set 3: (25:14)	Germany
8 September 2012	2012 Summer Paralympics	Final	London, United Kingdom	Bosnia and Herzegovina	3:1 Set 1: (19:25); Set 2: (25:21); Set 3: (25:22); Set 4: (25:15)	Iran
16 September 2013	2013 European Championships	Group A	Elbląg, Poland	Bosnia and Herzegovina	3:0 Set 1: (25:22); Set 2: (25:12); Set 3: (25:8)	Croatia
17 September 2013	2013 European Championships	Group A	Elbląg, Poland	Bosnia and Herzegovina	3:0 Set 1: (25:9); Set 2: (25:7); Set 3: (25:8)	Serbia
19 September 2013	2013 European Championships	QF	Elbląg, Poland	Bosnia and Herzegovina	3:0 Set 1: (25:23); Set 2: (25:11); Set 3: (25:8)	Netherlands
20 September 2013	2013 European Championships	SF	Elbląg, Poland	Bosnia and Herzegovina	3:0 Set 1: (25:11); Set 2: (25:19); Set 3: (25:13)	Ukraine
21 September 2013	2013 European Championships	Final	Elbląg, Poland	Bosnia and Herzegovina	3:0	Russia
15 June 2014	2014 World Championships	Group C	Elbląg, Poland	Bosnia and Herzegovina	3:0 Set 1: (25:10); Set 2: (25:19); Set 3: (25:15)	Kazakhstan
16 June 2014	2014 World Championships	Group C	Elbląg, Poland	Bosnia and Herzegovina	3:0 Set 1: (25:20); Set 2: (25:11); Set 3: (25:13)	Brazil
17 June 2014	2014 World Championships	Group C	Elbląg, Poland	Bosnia and Herzegovina	3:0 Set 1: (25:19); Set 2: (25:10); Set 3: (25:26)	Croatia
19 June 2014	2014 World Championships	QF	Elbląg, Poland	Bosnia and Herzegovina	3:1 Set 1: (25:21); Set 2: (25:21); Set 3: (18:25); Set 4: (25:23)	Germany
20 June 2014	2014 World Championships	SF	Elbląg, Poland	Bosnia and Herzegovina	3:0 Set 1: (25:11); Set 2: (25:23); Set 3: (25:23)	Egypt
21 June 2014	2014 World Championships	Final	Elbląg, Poland	Bosnia and Herzegovina	3:1 Set 1: (25:22); Set 2: (20:25); Set 3: (25:7); Set 4: (28:26)	Brazil
2 October 2015	2015 European Championships	Pool B	Warendorf, Germany	Bosnia and Herzegovina	3:0 Set 1: (25:17); Set 2: (25:13); Set 3: (25:18)	Hungary
3 October 2015	2015 European Championships	Pool B	Warendorf, Germany	Bosnia and Herzegovina	3:0 Set 1: (25:11); Set 2: (25:15); Set 3: (25:15)	Netherlands
4 October 2015	2015 European Championships	Pool B	Warendorf, Germany	Bosnia and Herzegovina	3:0 Set 1: (25:13); Set 2: (25:19); Set 3: (25:17)	Serbia
5 October 2015	2015 European Championships	QF	Warendorf, Germany	Bosnia and Herzegovina	3:0 Set 1: (25:15); Set 2: (25:16); Set 3: (25:11)	Poland
6 October 2015	2015 European Championships	SF	Warendorf, Germany	Bosnia and Herzegovina	3:0 Set 1: (25:20); Set 2: (25:12); Set 3: (25:20)	Ukraine
7 October 2015	2015 European Championships	Final	Warendorf, Germany	Germany	0:3 Set 1: (22:25); Set 2: (19:25); Set 3: (23:25)	Bosnia and Herzegovina
10 September 2016	2016 Summer Paralympics	Group	Rio de Janeiro, Brazil	Bosnia and Herzegovina	3:0 Set 1: (25:12); Set 2: (25:22); Set 3: (25:20)	Ukraine
12 September 2016	2016 Summer Paralympics	Group	Rio de Janeiro, Brazil	Iran	3:0 Set 1: (25:17); Set 2: (25:22); Set 3: (25:17)	Bosnia and Herzegovina
14 September 2016	2016 Summer Paralympics	Group	Rio de Janeiro, Brazil	Bosnia and Herzegovina	3:0 Set 1: (25:14); Set 2: (25:22); Set 3: (25:19)	China
16 September 2016	2016 Summer Paralympics	SF	Rio de Janeiro, Brazil	Egypt	0:3 Set 1: (23:25); Set 2: (16:25); Set 3: (20:25)	Bosnia and Herzegovina
18 September 2016	2016 Summer Paralympics	Final	Rio de Janeiro, Brazil	Bosnia and Herzegovina	1:3 Set 1: (21:25); Set 2: (25:21); Set 3: (18:25); Set 4: (15:25)	Iran
6 November 2017	2017 European Championships	Group B	Poreč, Croatia	Bosnia and Herzegovina	3:0 Set 1: (25:7); Set 2: (25:13); Set 3: (25:5)	(Georgia (country)) Georgia
7 November 2017	2017 Sitting Volleyball European Championships	Group B	Poreč, Croatia	Bosnia and Herzegovina	3:0 Set 1: (25:6); Set 2: (25:13); Set 3: (25:13)	Hungary
8 November 2017	2017 Sitting Volleyball European Championships	Group B	Poreč, Croatia	Serbia	0:3 Set 1: (10:25); Set 2: (14:25); Set 3: (14:25)	Bosnia and Herzegovina
9 November 2017	2017 Sitting Volleyball European Championships	QF	Poreč, Croatia	Bosnia and Herzegovina	3:0 Set 1: (25:14); Set 2: (25:19); Set 3: (26:24)	Germany
10 November 2017	2017 Sitting Volleyball European Championships	SF	Poreč, Croatia	Bosnia and Herzegovina	2:3 Set 1: (18:25); Set 2: (25:18); Set 3: (19:25); Set 4: (25:20); Set 5: (12:15)	Russia
9 November 2017	2017 Sitting Volleyball European Championships	3rd Place	Poreč, Croatia	Croatia	0:3 Set 1: (21:25); Set 2: (16:25); Set 3: (18:25)	Bosnia and Herzegovina
19 April 2018	2018 Men's World Super 6	Match 1	Tabriz, Iran	Bosnia and Herzegovina	3:0 Set 1: (25:12); Set 2: (25:16); Set 3: (25:23)	United States
20 April 2018	2018 Men's World Super 6	Match 2	Tabriz, Iran	Iran	3:2 Set 1: (22:25); Set 2: (25:17); Set 3: (25:19); Set 4: (22:25); Set 5: (15:13)	(Bosnia and Herzegovina) Bosnia
21 April 2018	2018 Men's World Super 6	Match 3	Tabriz, Iran	Bosnia and Herzegovina	1:3 Set 1: (24:26); Set 2: (25:11); Set 3: (23:25); Set 4: (21:25)	Russia
22 April 2018	2018 Men's World Super 6	Match 4	Tabriz, Iran	Bosnia and Herzegovina	3:0 Set 1: (25:23); Set 2: (25:19); Set 3: (25:22)	Ukraine
23 April 2018	2018 Men's World Super 6	Match 5	Tabriz, Iran	Bosnia and Herzegovina	3:0 Set 1: (25:18); Set 2: (25:22); Set 3: (25:19)	(Germany)
24 April 2018	2018 Men's World Super 6	3rd Place	Tabriz, Iran	Bosnia and Herzegovina	3:0 Set 1: (25:21); Set 2: (25:18); Set 3: (25:20)	Ukraine

Legend

Win	Loss

== Statistics ==
=== Most appearances – All time list ===
Sorted by date of birth as it is difficult to know exact number of appearances. Most appearances during career playing for Bosnia and Herz. Former Yugoslavia statistics where applicable not included.

#	Name	Age	Career
1	Ševko Nuhanović	17 September 1958 (age 68)	1994–2000
2	Mirza Hrustemović	1 October 1959 (age 67)	1994–1999
3	Nevzet Alić	5 January 1961 (age 65)	1999–2002
4	Dževad Hamzić	4 September 1968 (age 58)	1994–present
5	Ejub Mehmedović	18 October 1968 (age 58)	1999 – ?
6	Asim Medić	3 August 1969 (age 57)	1997–present
7	Nedžad Salkić	26 October 1969 (age 57)	1997 – ?
8	Zikret Mahmić	4 January 1971 (age 55)	1995 – ?
9	Sabahudin Delalić	17 August 1972 (age 54)	1994–present
10	Esad Durmišević	22 January 1972 (age 54)	2001 – ?
11	Fikret Čaušević	13 May 1973 (age 53)	1995 – ?
12	Ismet Godinjak	17 March 1973 (age 53)	1994–present
13	Hidajet Jusufović	9 December 1973 (age 52)	? – ?
14	Asad Omerović	8 October 1974 (age 52)	? – ?
15	Nizam Čančar	17 September 1975 (age 51)	1994–present
16	Adnan Manko	16 January 1977 (age 49)	1994–present
17	Ermin Jusufović	31 May 1981 (age 45)	2001–present
18	Safet Alibašić	21 December 1982 (age 43)	2002–present
19	Mirzet Duran	13 October 1986 (age 40)	2007–present
20	Adnan Kešmer	11 October 1986 (age 40)	2011–?
21	Brkić Jasmin	24 March 1991 (age 35)	2017–?
22	Armin Šehić	11 April 1994 (age 32)	2013–present

=== Multiple gold medalists at Paralympics ===
This is a list of multiple Paralympics gold medalists for Bosnia in sitting volleyball, listing people who have won two or more gold medals (sorted by gold medal first).

Athlete	Sport	Paralympics Gold	Gold	Para Silver	Silver	Para Bronze	Bronze	Total
Adnan Manko	Sitting Volleyball	2004, 2012	2	2000, 2008, 2016	3	2021	1	6
Asim Medić	Sitting Volleyball	2004, 2012	2	2000, 2008, 2016	3	2021	0	5
Dževad Hamzić	Sitting Volleyball	2004, 2012	2	2000, 2008, 2016	3	2021	1	6
Ismet Godinjak	Sitting Volleyball	2004, 2012	2	2000, 2008, 2016	3	2021	1	6
Sabahudin Delalić	Sitting Volleyball	2004, 2012	2	2000, 2008, 2016	3	2021	1	6
Ermin Jusufović	Sitting Volleyball	2004, 2012	2	2008, 2016	2	2021	1	5
Safet Alibašić	Sitting Volleyball	2004, 2012	2	2008, 2016	2	2021	1	5

=== Biggest wins by Bosnia ===
Table sorted by points conceded (scored against BiH) in straight sets win (least to most).

#	Opponent	Result	Pts agst.	Competition
1.	Greece	3:0 (25:4, 25:5, 25:6)	15 pts	2007 European Championships
2.	Greece	3:0 (25:7, 25:6, 25:7)	20 pts	2005 European Championships
3.	Serbia	3:0 (25:9, 25:7, 25:8)	24 pts	2013 European Championships
=4.	Croatia	3:0 (25:10, 25:6, 25:9)	25 pts	2005 European Championships
=4.	Libya	3:0 (25:8, 25:7, 25:10)	25 pts	2010 World Championships
6.	Rwanda	3:0 (25:7, 25:12, 25:8)	27 pts	2012 Summer Paralympics
7.	(United Kingdom) Great Britain	3:0 (25:4, 25:15, 25:10)	29 pts	2007 European Championships
=8.	Latvia	3:0 (25:8, 25:12, 25:12)	32 pts	2003 European Championships
=8.	Brazil	3:0 (25:14, 25:5, 25:13)	32 pts	2006 World Championships
10.	Poland	3:0 (25:10, 25:9, 25:14)	33 pts	2005 European Championships
11.	Iraq	3:0 (25:6, 25:14, 25:16)	36 pts	2008 Summer Paralympics
12.	United States	3:0 (25:15, 25:15, 25:10)	40 pts	2010 World Championships
13.	Netherlands	3:0 (25:11, 25:15, 25:15)	41 pts	2015 European Championships

=== Biggest defeats by Bosnia ===
#	Opponent	Result	Pts for.	Competition
1.	Croatia	0:3 (6:15, 8:15, 11:15)	25 pts	1995 European Championship Qual.
2.	Iran	0:3 (17:25, 22:25, 17:25)	56 pts	2016 Summer Paralympics

=== World ranking ===
As at 28 September 2016.
Bosnia best European rank in sitting volleyball was 1st.

At 2016 Rio Paralympics, Bosnia retained Rank at No. 1 (seed No. 1) as defending Paralympic champion.

Rank	Movement	Country	Points	Region
1	Steady	Iran	5215	Asia-Oceania
2	Steady	Brazil	4708	Pan America
3	▲1	Egypt	4523	Africa
4	▼1	Bosnia and Herzegovina	4300	Europe
5	Steady	Germany	3578	Europe

== Top rivals ==
Rivals Bosnia predominantly meets in the finals of major competitions listed.

=== Bosnia–Iran rivalry ===
Bosnians brought an end to the Iranians' series of four Paralympic golds at Athens 2004, the two teams have met in all the finals of the Paralympic Games and world championships, except in 2014, when the Bosnians faced Brazil.

Sitting volleyball is not the only men's sport these two nations faced each other at the biggest stage of a competition. Bosnia played and beat Iran at both 2014 Soccer World Cup and 2015 Handball World Championship.

Stage	Tournament	Opponents	Result	Details
Final	2000 Summer Paralympics	Iran	0:3	
SF	2002 World Championships	Iran	3:0	
Final	2004 Summer Paralympics	Iran	3:2	Set 1: (25:23); Set 2: (20:25); Set 3: (20:25); Set 4: (27:25); Set 5: (15:10)
Final	2006 World Championships	Iran	3:1	Set 1: (25:20); Set 2: (23:25); Set 3: (25:23); Set 4: (25:16)
Final	2008 Summer Paralympics	Iran	0:3	Set 1: (22:25); Set 2: (18:25); Set 3: (22:25)
Final	2010 World Championships	Iran	2:3	Set 1: (17:25); Set 2: (21:25); Set 3: (25:18); Set 4: (25:19); Set 5: (11:15)
Group	2012 Summer Paralympics	Iran	1:3	Set 1: (25:22); Set 2: (18:25); Set 3: (18:25); Set 4: (22:25)
Final	2012 Summer Paralympics	Iran	3:1	Set 1: (19:25); Set 2: (25:21); Set 3: (25:22); Set 4: (25:15)
Group	2016 Summer Paralympics	Iran	0:3	Set 1: (17:25); Set 2: (22:25); Set 3: (17:25)
Final	2016 Summer Paralympics	Iran	1:3	Set 1: (21:25); Set 2: (25:21); Set 3: (18:25); Set 4: (15:25)
Final	2024 Summer Paralympics	Iran	1:3	Set 1: (25:22); Set 2: (28:30); Set 3: (16:25); Set 4: (14:25)
TOTAL Record
–	9 Tournaments	Played: 11	Won: 4; Lost: 7	Won Sets by Bosnia: 17; Won Sets by Iran: 25

=== Bosnia–Germany rivalry ===
Bosnia since team formation has been an adversary to Germany during European sitting volleyball championships as teams have met at almost every major tournament in later stages of the finals.

Stage	Tournament	Opponents	Result	Details
GS	1995 European Championships	Germany	0:3	
Final	1999 European Championships	Germany	3:0	
QF	2000 Summer Paralympics	Germany	3:1	
Final	2001 European Championships	Germany	3:1	
GS	2002 World Championships	Germany	3:0	
Final	2002 World Championships	Germany	3:0	
Final	2003 European Championships	Germany	3:0	Set 1: (25:21); Set 2: (25:18); Set 3: (25:12)
SF	2004 Summer Paralympics	Germany	3:2	
Final	2005 European Championships	Germany	3:0	Set 1: (25:21); Set 2: (25:14); Set 3: (25:21)
GS	2006 World Championships	Germany	3:0	Set 1: (25:20); Set 2: (25:18); Set 3: (25:10)
Int.	2007 Friendly (in Berlin, GER)	Germany	3:1	
SF	2007 European Championships	Germany	3:2	Set 1: (17:25); Set 2: (25:18); Set 3: (22:25); Set 4: (25:17); Set 5: (15:12)
SF	2009 European Championships	Germany	3:0	Set 1: (25:22); Set 2: (25:14); Set 3: (25:14)
SF	2012 Summer Paralympics	Germany	3:0	Set 1: (25:19); Set 2: (25:20); Set 3: (25:14)
QF	2014 World Championships	Germany	3:1	Set 1: (25:21); Set 2: (25:21); Set 3: (18:25); Set 4: (25:23)
Final	2015 European Championships	Germany	3:0	Set 1: (25:22); Set 2: (25:19); Set 3: (25:23)
QF	2017 European Championships	Germany	3:0	Set 1: (25:14); Set 2: (25:19); Set 3: (26:24)
SF	2024 Summer Paralympics	Germany	3:0	Set 1: (25:23); Set 2: (25:6); Set 3: (31:29)
TOTAL Record
–	16 Tournaments	Played: 18	Won: 17; Lost: 1	Won Sets by Bosnia: 48; Won Sets by Germany: 11

=== Bosnia–Russia rivalry ===
Bosnia since team formation has been an adversary to Russia during European sitting volleyball championships as teams have met several times at major tournament finals.

Stage	Tournament	Opponents	Result	Details
GS	1999 European Championships	Russia	3:0	
SF	2003 European Championships	Russia	3:0	
GS	2005 European Championships	Russia	3:1	Set 1: (25:16); Set 2: (25:18); Set 3: (29:31); Set 4: (25:17)
GS	2006 World Championships	Russia	3:1	
Final	2007 European Championships	Russia	3:2	Set 1: (25:20); Set 2: (25:17); Set 3: (18:25); Set 4: (21:25); Set 5: (15:7)
GS	2008 Summer Paralympics	Russia	3:1	Set 1: (25:21); Set 2: (25:22); Set 3: (18:25); Set 4: (25:16)
GS	2009 European Championships	Russia	3:0	Set 1: (25:15); Set 2: (25:23); Set 3: (25:14)
Final	2009 European Championships	Russia	3:1	Set 1: (20:25); Set 2: (25:12); Set 3: (25:21); Set 4: (25:18)
SF	2010 World Championships	Russia	3:1	Set 1: (25:16); Set 2: (25:20); Set 3: (22:25); Set 4: (25:18)
GS	2011 European Championships	Russia	3:1	Set 1: (27:25); Set 2: (25:22); Set 3: (25:23)
Final	2011 European Championships	Russia	3:1	Set 1: (22:25); Set 2: (25:23); Set 3: (25:10); Set 4: (25:23)
Final	2013 European Championships	Russia	3:0	
SF	2017 European Championships	Russia	2:3	Set 1: (18:25); Set 2: (25:18); Set 3: (19:25); Set 4: (25:20); Set 5: (12:15)
TOTAL Record
–	11 Tournaments	Played: 13	Won: 12; Lost: 1	Won Sets by Bosnia: 36; Won Sets by Russia: 9

== Sport in popular culture ==
- West Ham United and Croatian former soccer manager Slaven Bilić played sitting volleyball during International Paralympic Day in Split on 8 September 2011.
- Sergej Barbarez met the OKI Fantomi club during the friendly sitting volleyball tournament 2006 Siemens Cup in Hamburg. Fantomi beat Germany in the final 2–0.

== See also ==
- Bosnia and Herzegovina at the Paralympics
- Volleyball at the Summer Paralympics
- World Organization Volleyball for Disabled

== Bibliography ==
- Ng, Kwok (2012). When Sitting is Not Resting: Sitting Volleyball. Author House. ISBN 978-1-4772-1791-7.
- Geoffery Z. Kohe, Derek M. Peters (2016). High Performance Disability Sport Coaching. Routledge. ISBN 978-1-317-50715-4.
