= Sitting volleyball at the 2024 Summer Paralympics – Men's tournament =

Men's sitting volleyball at the XVII Paralympic Games
- Venue: North Paris Arena
- Dates: 29 August – 6 September 2024
- Competitors: 96 from 8 nations

Medalists
1st place, gold medalist(s)		Iran (8th title)
2nd place, silver medalist(s)		Bosnia and Herzegovina
3rd place, bronze medalist(s)		Egypt

The men's tournament in sitting volleyball at the 2024 Summer Paralympics was held between 29 August until 6 September 2024 at the North Paris Arena, Paris.

Iran won their fourth consecutive gold medal with a win over Bosnia and Herzegovina in the gold medal match. Egypt secured bronze by defeating Germany in the bronze medal match.

== Qualified teams ==
Means of qualification	Date	Venue	Berths	Qualified
Host country allocation	—	—	1	France
2022 Sitting Volleyball World Championships	4–11 November 2022	(Bosnia and Herzegovina) Sarajevo	1	Iran
2023 Pan American Sitting Volleyball Championships	9–13 May 2023	(Canada) Edmonton	1	Brazil
2023 Asia and Oceania Sitting Volleyball Championships	3–8 July 2023	(Kazakhstan) Astana	1	Kazakhstan
2023 Sitting Volleyball European Championships	9–15 October 2023	(Italy) Caorle	1	Bosnia and Herzegovina
2023 Sitting Volleyball World Cup	11–18 November 2023	(Egypt) Cairo	1	Germany
2024 African Sitting Volleyball Championships	29 January–3 February 2024	(Nigeria) Lagos	1	Egypt
2024 Paralympic Final Qualification Tournament	3–10 April 2024	(China) Dali	1	Ukraine
Total			8	

== Schedule ==
All times are Central European Summer Time (UTC+2)

Date	Round
29 August – 3 September 2024	Preliminary Round
4 September 2024	Classification 5-6
4 September 2024	Classification 7-8
5 September 2024	Semifinals
6 September 2024	Bronze Medal Match
6 September 2024	Gold Medal Match
All times are Central European Summer Time (UTC+2)

== Results ==
=== Preliminary round ===
==== Pool A ====
Pos	Team	Pld	W	L	Pts	SW	SL	SR	SPW	SPL	SPR	Qualification
1	Bosnia and Herzegovina	3	3	0	3	9	3	3.000	280	228	1.228	Semifinals
2	Egypt	3	2	1	2	7	4	1.750	259	214	1.210	Semifinals
3	Kazakhstan	3	1	2	1	6	6	1.000	257	226	1.137	Fifth place match
4	France (H)	3	0	3	0	0	9	0.000	100	225	0.444	Seventh place match

Source: Paris 2024
(H) Host

29 August 2024; 14:00	Egypt	1–3	Bosnia and Herzegovina	North Paris Arena, Paris; Attendance: 3,306; Referees: Andre Calado Ferreira (BRA), Mahdi Navidino (IRN)
29 August 2024; 14:00	(28–26, 19–25, 23–25, 23–25); P2 Report			North Paris Arena, Paris; Attendance: 3,306; Referees: Andre Calado Ferreira (BRA), Mahdi Navidino (IRN)

29 August 2024; 20:00	France	0–3	Kazakhstan	North Paris Arena, Paris; Attendance: 4,072; Referees: Khalid Shanishah (LBA), Mirza Basic (BIH)
29 August 2024; 20:00	(7–25, 20–25, 7–25); P2 Report			North Paris Arena, Paris; Attendance: 4,072; Referees: Khalid Shanishah (LBA), Mirza Basic (BIH)

31 August 2024; 14:15	Kazakhstan	2–3	Bosnia and Herzegovina	North Paris Arena, Paris; Attendance: 3,851; Referees: Spela Plesnik (SLO), Marie-Claude Richer (CAN)
31 August 2024; 14:15	(24–26, 13–25, 25–14, 25–21, 8–15); P2 Report			North Paris Arena, Paris; Attendance: 3,851; Referees: Spela Plesnik (SLO), Marie-Claude Richer (CAN)

31 August 2024; 18:00	France	0–3	Egypt	North Paris Arena, Paris; Attendance: 3,872; Referees: Andre Calado Ferreira (BRA), Neal Konowalyk (GER)
31 August 2024; 18:00	(11–25, 3–25, 12–25); P2 Report			North Paris Arena, Paris; Attendance: 3,872; Referees: Andre Calado Ferreira (BRA), Neal Konowalyk (GER)

2 September 2024; 12:00	Egypt	3–1	Kazakhstan	North Paris Arena, Paris; Attendance: 1,835; Referees: Marie-Claude Richer (CAN), Andre Calado Ferreira (BRA)
2 September 2024; 12:00	(25–21, 25–23, 16–25, 25–18); P2 Report			North Paris Arena, Paris; Attendance: 1,835; Referees: Marie-Claude Richer (CAN), Andre Calado Ferreira (BRA)

2 September 2024; 20:00	Bosnia and Herzegovina	3–0	France	North Paris Arena, Paris; Attendance: 2,338; Referees: Krisztina Arpas (HUN), Mahdi Navidino (IRN)
2 September 2024; 20:00	(25–12, 25–13, 25–15); P2 Report			North Paris Arena, Paris; Attendance: 2,338; Referees: Krisztina Arpas (HUN), Mahdi Navidino (IRN)

==== Pool B ====
Pos	Team	Pld	W	L	Pts	SW	SL	SR	SPW	SPL	SPR	Qualification
1	Iran	3	3	0	3	9	0	MAX	225	132	1.705	Semifinals
2	Germany	3	2	1	2	6	4	1.500	223	213	1.047	Semifinals
3	Brazil	3	1	2	1	3	7	0.429	205	240	0.854	Fifth place match
4	Ukraine	3	0	3	0	2	9	0.222	201	269	0.747	Seventh place match

Source: Paris 2024

30 August 2024; 14:20	Iran	3–0	Ukraine	North Paris Arena, Paris; Attendance: 2,833; Referees: Amina Elsergany (EGY), Benno Meijer (NED)
30 August 2024; 14:20	(25–13, 25–12, 25–18); P2 Report			North Paris Arena, Paris; Attendance: 2,833; Referees: Amina Elsergany (EGY), Benno Meijer (NED)

30 August 2024; 18:00	Brazil	0–3	Germany	North Paris Arena, Paris; Attendance: 3,752; Referees: Neal Konowalyk (GER), Krisztina Arpas (HUN)
30 August 2024; 18:00	(16–25, 29–31, 19–25); P2 Report			North Paris Arena, Paris; Attendance: 3,752; Referees: Neal Konowalyk (GER), Krisztina Arpas (HUN)

1 September 2024; 12:00	Iran	3–0	Brazil	North Paris Arena, Paris; Attendance: 3,860; Referees: Ayan Rakhmetov (KAZ), Khalid Shanishah (LBA)
1 September 2024; 12:00	(25–12, 25–13, 25–19); P2 Report			North Paris Arena, Paris; Attendance: 3,860; Referees: Ayan Rakhmetov (KAZ), Khalid Shanishah (LBA)

1 September 2024; 18:00	Ukraine	1–3	Germany	North Paris Arena, Paris; Attendance: 3,874; Referees: Philippe Dauchel (FRA), Mirza Basic (BIH)
1 September 2024; 18:00	(14–25, 25–22, 17–25, 18–25); P2 Report			North Paris Arena, Paris; Attendance: 3,874; Referees: Philippe Dauchel (FRA), Mirza Basic (BIH)

3 September 2024; 14:00	Germany	0–3	Iran	North Paris Arena, Paris; Attendance: 2,575; Referees: Benno Meijer (NED), Slavisa Kuzmenovic (BIH)
3 September 2024; 14:00	(16–25, 13–25, 16–25); P2 Report			North Paris Arena, Paris; Attendance: 2,575; Referees: Benno Meijer (NED), Slavisa Kuzmenovic (BIH)

3 September 2024; 18:30	Brazil	3–1	Ukraine	North Paris Arena, Paris; Attendance: 2,377; Referees: Amina Elsergany (EGY), Ayan Rakhmetov (KAZ)
3 September 2024; 18:30	(25–17, 25–22, 22–25, 25–20); P2 Report			North Paris Arena, Paris; Attendance: 2,377; Referees: Amina Elsergany (EGY), Ayan Rakhmetov (KAZ)

== Knockout stage ==
=== Bracket ===
Semifinals
5 September
Bosnia and Herzegovina	3
Germany	0
5 September
Iran	3
Egypt	1

Gold medal match
6 September
Bosnia and Herzegovina	1
Iran	3
Bronze medal match
6 September
Germany	2
Egypt	3

=== Semifinals ===
5 September 2024; 12:00	Bosnia and Herzegovina	3–0	Germany	North Paris Arena, Paris; Attendance: 3,216; Referees: Benno Meijer (NED), Ayan Rakhmetov (KAZ)
5 September 2024; 12:00	(25–23, 25–6, 31–29); P2 Report			North Paris Arena, Paris; Attendance: 3,216; Referees: Benno Meijer (NED), Ayan Rakhmetov (KAZ)

5 September 2024; 14:00	Iran	3–1	Egypt	North Paris Arena, Paris; Attendance: 3,216; Referees: Neal Konowalyk (GER), Khalid Shanishah (LBA)
5 September 2024; 14:00	(25–14, 25–15, 20–25, 25–8); P2 Report			North Paris Arena, Paris; Attendance: 3,216; Referees: Neal Konowalyk (GER), Khalid Shanishah (LBA)

=== Seventh place match ===
4 September 2024; 12:00	France	0–3	Ukraine	North Paris Arena, Paris; Attendance: 2,583; Referees: Mahdi Navidino (IRN), Mirza Basic (BIH)
4 September 2024; 12:00	(16–25, 11–25, 18–25); P2 Report			North Paris Arena, Paris; Attendance: 2,583; Referees: Mahdi Navidino (IRN), Mirza Basic (BIH)

=== Fifth place match ===
4 September 2024; 20:00	Kazakhstan	3–0	Brazil	North Paris Arena, Paris; Attendance: 1,570; Referees: Spela Plesnik (SLO), Benno Meijer (NED)
4 September 2024; 20:00	(25–19, 25–18, 25–19); P2 Report			North Paris Arena, Paris; Attendance: 1,570; Referees: Spela Plesnik (SLO), Benno Meijer (NED)

=== Bronze medal match ===
6 September 2024; 15:00	Germany	2–3	Egypt	North Paris Arena, Paris; Attendance: 3,910; Referees: Slavisa Kuzmanovic (BIH), Benno Meijer (NED)
6 September 2024; 15:00	(22–25, 25–23, 23–25, 25–23, 10–15); P2 Report			North Paris Arena, Paris; Attendance: 3,910; Referees: Slavisa Kuzmanovic (BIH), Benno Meijer (NED)

=== Gold medal match ===
6 September 2024; 19:30	Bosnia and Herzegovina	1–3	Iran	North Paris Arena, Paris; Attendance: 4,010; Referees: Andre Calado Ferreira (BRA), Neal Konowalyk (GER)
6 September 2024; 19:30	(25–22, 28–30, 16–25, 14–25); P2 Report			North Paris Arena, Paris; Attendance: 4,010; Referees: Andre Calado Ferreira (BRA), Neal Konowalyk (GER)

== Final ranking ==
Rank	Team
1st place, gold medalist(s)	Iran
2nd place, silver medalist(s)	Bosnia and Herzegovina
3rd place, bronze medalist(s)	Egypt
4	Germany
5	Kazakhstan
6	Brazil
7	Ukraine
8	France

== See also ==
- Sitting volleyball at the 2024 Summer Paralympics – Women's tournament
