= 2023 Sitting Volleyball World Cup – Men's event =

Tournament details
- Host country: Egypt
- City: Cairo
- Dates: 11–18 November
- Teams: 13 (from 4 confederations)
- Venue: 1 (in 1 host city)

Final positions
- Champions: Iran (1st title)
- Runners-up: Egypt
- Third place: Germany
- Fourth place: Ukraine

Tournament statistics
- Matches played: 37

The 2023 Sitting Volleyball World Cup – Men's event was the 6th edition of this tournament (3rd using the World Cup moniker) and was, for the first time, held in Cairo, Egypt. The winners or highest ranked team not yet qualified, will advance to the 2024 Summer Paralympics. The defending champions are Iran, and successfully defended their title, overcoming Egypt 3–0 in the final.

== Host selection ==
Originally, Cairo was chosen as the replacement venue for the 2020 edition in Hangzhou, China after the Chinese withdrew because of the COVID-19 pandemic (the competition dates were 24–30 April). However, on 12 March, it was confirmed the event would be postponed until further notice. The tournament was going to commence on 10–15 December 2021. Although, for a second time, the event was postponed. After multiple postponements, Cairo, Egypt was given the hosting rights on the 13 September 2022 for the 2023 edition. This marks Egypt's first time organising the event.

== Teams ==
Host (1)

- Egypt

Participating teams (12)

- Algeria
- Brazil
- China
- France
- Germany
- Great Britain
- India
- Iran
- Iraq
- Japan
- ~~Nigeria~~ (Note: Nigeria originally entered, but withdrew right before the tournament started. They were originally placed in Group C.)
- Rwanda
- Ukraine

== Venue ==
The venue was the New Capital Sports Hall in the New Administrative Capital, near Cairo. Despite the tournament being held just outside of Cairo, the event was still called Cairo 2023.

2023 Sitting Volleyball World Cup – Men's event is located in Egypt	New Administrative Capital
2023 Sitting Volleyball World Cup – Men's event is located in Egypt	New Capital Sports Hall
2023 Sitting Volleyball World Cup – Men's event is located in Egypt	Capacity: 7,500

== Broadcasting rights ==
Every game was broadcast on the World ParaVolley YouTube channel.

== Squads ==
Squads ranged from 8 to 14 players for the tournament.

== Format ==
13 teams are divided into three groups of three and a group of four. The top two in each group plays in the quarterfinals, while the eliminated teams plays in the classification group.

== Group stage ==
=== Group A ===
- All times are local.

Pos	Team	Pld	W	L	Pts	SW	SL	SR	SPW	SPL	SPR	Qualification
1	Egypt (H)	2	2	0	6	6	0	MAX	150	102	1.471	Quarterfinals
2	Iraq	2	1	1	2	3	5	0.600	156	181	0.862	Quarterfinals
3	Rwanda	2	0	2	1	2	6	0.333	157	180	0.872	

Source: Report
(H) Host

Date	Time		Score		Set 1	Set 2	Set 3	Set 4	Set 5	Total	Report
11 Nov	18:30	Iraq	0–3	Egypt	17–25	11–25	23–25			51–75	
12 Nov	10:00	Rwanda	2–3	Iraq	22–25	25–16	20–25	26–24	13–15	106–105	
14 Nov	10:00	Egypt	3–0	Rwanda	25–16	25–17	25–18			75–51	

=== Group B ===
Pos	Team	Pld	W	L	Pts	SW	SL	SR	SPW	SPL	SPR	Qualification
1	Iran	2	2	0	6	6	0	MAX	150	73	2.055	Quarterfinals
2	Japan	2	1	1	3	3	4	0.750	149	155	0.961	Quarterfinals
3	Algeria	2	0	2	0	1	6	0.167	105	176	0.597	

Source: Report

Date	Time		Score		Set 1	Set 2	Set 3	Set 4	Set 5	Total	Report
12 Nov	11:30	Japan	3–1	Algeria	26–28	25–18	25–21	25–13		101–80	
13 Nov	10:00	Iran	3–0	Japan	25–13	25–14	25–21			75–48	
14 Nov	11:30	Algeria	0–3	Iran	5–25	10–25	10–25			25–75	

=== Group C ===
Pos	Team	Pld	W	L	Pts	SW	SL	SR	SPW	SPL	SPR	Qualification
1	China	2	2	0	6	6	1	6.000	168	90	1.867	Quarterfinals
2	Brazil	2	1	1	3	4	3	1.333	141	130	1.085	Quarterfinals
3	India	2	0	2	0	0	6	0.000	61	150	0.407	

Source: Report

Date	Time		Score		Set 1	Set 2	Set 3	Set 4	Set 5	Total	Report
12 Nov	13:30	China	3–0	India	25–4	25–8	25–12			75–24	
13 Nov	12:00	Brazil	1–3	China	25–18	17–25	10–25	14–25		66–93	
14 Nov	13:30	India	0–3	Brazil	7–25	18–25	12–25			37–75	

=== Group D ===
Pos	Team	Pld	W	L	Pts	SW	SL	SR	SPW	SPL	SPR	Qualification
1	Germany	3	3	0	9	9	0	MAX	225	109	2.064	Quarterfinals
2	Ukraine	3	2	1	6	6	3	2.000	198	169	1.172	Quarterfinals
3	France	3	1	2	3	3	7	0.429	185	223	0.830	
4	Great Britain	3	0	3	0	1	9	0.111	140	247	0.567	

Source: Report

Date	Time		Score		Set 1	Set 2	Set 3	Set 4	Set 5	Total	Report
12 Nov	15:00	Germany	3–0	Great Britain	25–9	25–6	25–8			75–23	
12 Nov	17:00	Ukraine	3–0	France	25–19	25–10	25–21			75–50	
13 Nov	14:00	Great Britain	1–3	France	25–22	17–25	17–25	14–25		73–97	
13 Nov	15:30	Germany	3–0	Ukraine	25–13	25–13	25–22			75–48	
14 Nov	15:00	Ukraine	3–0	Great Britain	25–14	25–18	25–12			75–44	
14 Nov	17:00	France	0–3	Germany	8–25	16–25	14–25			38–75	
13 Nov	14:00	Great Britain	1–3	France	25–22	17–25	17–25	14–25		73–97	
13 Nov	15:30	Germany	3–0	Ukraine	25–13	25–13	25–22			75–48	
14 Nov	15:00	Ukraine	3–0	Great Britain	25–14	25–18	25–12			75–44	
14 Nov	17:00	France	0–3	Germany	8–25	16–25	14–25			38–75	

== Knockout stage ==
Quarter-finals
15 November
Egypt	3
Japan	0
15 November
Germany	3
Brazil	1
15 November
Iran	3
Iraq	0
15 November
China	1
Ukraine	3

Semi-finals
16 November
Egypt	3
Germany	1
16 November
Iran	3
Ukraine	0

Final
18 November
Egypt	0
Iran	3
Third place
18 November
Germany	3
Ukraine	2

=== 5–8 classification bracket ===
Semifinals
17 November
Japan	1
Brazil	3
17 November
Iraq	0
China	3

5th place match
18 November
Brazil	3
China	1
7th place match
18 November
Japan	1
Iraq	3

=== Quarterfinals ===
Date	Time		Score		Set 1	Set 2	Set 3	Set 4	Set 5	Total	Report
15 Nov	11:30	Egypt	3–0	Japan	25–12	25–19	25–9			75–40	
15 Nov	13:30	Iran	3–0	Iraq	25–12	25–14	25–13			75–39	
15 Nov	15:00	China	1–3	Ukraine	20–25	25–22	23–25	17–25		85–97	
15 Nov	17:00	Germany	3–1	Brazil	25–20	25–19	20–25	25–21		95–85	

=== Semifinals ===
Date	Time		Score		Set 1	Set 2	Set 3	Set 4	Set 5	Total	Report
16 Nov	13:30	Iran	3–0	Ukraine	25–12	25–10	25–22			75–44	
16 Nov	15:00	Egypt	3–1	Germany	25–20	25–20	23–25	25–18		98–83	

=== Third place match ===
Date	Time		Score		Set 1	Set 2	Set 3	Set 4	Set 5	Total	Report
18 Nov	13:30	Germany	3–2	Ukraine	25–16	24–26	22–25	25–18	15–5	111–90	

=== Final ===
Date	Time		Score		Set 1	Set 2	Set 3	Set 4	Set 5	Total	Report
18 Nov	18:00	Egypt	0–3	Iran	21–25	19–25	17–25			57–75	

=== 5–8 Semifinals ===
Date	Time		Score		Set 1	Set 2	Set 3	Set 4	Set 5	Total	Report
16 Nov	10:00	Iraq	0–3	China	14–25	13–25	9–25			36–75	
16 Nov	11:30	Japan	1–3	Brazil	25–21	12–25	6–25	16–25		59–96	

=== Seventh place match ===
Date	Time		Score		Set 1	Set 2	Set 3	Set 4	Set 5	Total	Report
18 Nov	10:00	Japan	1–3	Iraq	26–24	14–25	21–25	13–25		74–99	

=== Fifth place match ===
Date	Time		Score		Set 1	Set 2	Set 3	Set 4	Set 5	Total	Report
18 Nov	11:30	China	1–3	Brazil	21–25	22–25	28–26	20–25		91–101	

=== 9–13th placement group ===
The five teams who failed to make quarterfinals all play each other in a five team group to decide the places 9–13.

Pos	Team	Pld	W	L	Pts	SW	SL	SR	SPW	SPL	SPR	Qualification
1	Rwanda	4	4	0	12	12	0	MAX	300	169	1.775	Ninth place
2	France	4	3	1	9	9	5	1.800	306	282	1.085	Tenth place
3	Algeria	4	2	2	6	7	6	1.167	287	268	1.071	Eleventh place
4	Great Britain	4	1	3	3	4	9	0.444	255	295	0.864	Twelfth place
5	India	4	0	4	0	0	12	0.000	166	300	0.553	Thirteenth place

Date	Time		Score		Set 1	Set 2	Set 3	Set 4	Set 5	Total	Report
15 Nov	10:00	Algeria	3–0	Great Britain	25–21	25–17	26–24			76–62	
15 Nov	17:30	Rwanda	3–0	France	25–11	25–8	25–21			75–40	
15 Nov	19:00	Great Britain	3–0	India	25–21	25–17	25–12			75–50	
16 Nov	10:30	Rwanda	3–0	Algeria	25–16	25–19	25–16			75–51	
16 Nov	17:00	India	0–3	France	11–25	11–25	19–25			41–75	
16 Nov	18:30	Great Britain	0–3	Rwanda	9–25	17–25	11–25			37–75	
17 Nov	10:00	France	3–1	Algeria	25–23	22–25	25–20	25–17		97–85	
17 Nov	11:30	India	0–3	Rwanda	8–25	14–25	19–25			41–75	
17 Nov	15:00	France	3–1	Great Britain	25–14	19–25	25–21	25–21		94–81	
17 Nov	17:00	Algeria	3–0	India	25–15	25–8	25–11			75–34	

== Final rankings ==
Since Iran qualified for the Paralympics via winning the world championship, and Egypt qualified due to winning the African championship, Germany took the ticket to the Paralympics.

Rank	Team
Gold medal	Iran
Silver medal	Egypt
Bronze medal	Germany
4	Ukraine
5	Brazil
6	China
7	Iraq
8	Japan
9	Rwanda
10	France
11	Algeria
12	Great Britain
13	India

Team Qualified for the 2024 Paralympics

== Awards ==
The awards were as follows:

MVP

- (Iran) Davoud Alipourian

Best Setter

- (Iran) Davoud Alipourian

Best Attacker

- (Egypt) Hesham Salahadeen Abdel Maksod

Best Receiver

- (Iran) Meisam Ali Pour

Best Server

- (Egypt) Elsayed Moussa Saad Moussa

Best Blocker

- (Germany) Dominik Marcel Albrecht

Best Libero

- (Egypt) Abdelnaby Hassan Ahmed Abdellatif

== See also ==
- 2023 Sitting Volleyball World Cup – Women's event
- 2022 Sitting Volleyball World Championships – Men's event
- 2022 Sitting Volleyball World Championships – Women's event
- 2023 Sitting Volleyball European Championships – Men's event
- 2023 Sitting Volleyball European Championships – Women's event
- 2023 Asia and Oceania Sitting Volleyball Championships
- 2023 Pan American Sitting Volleyball Championships
- 2024 African Sitting Volleyball Championships – Men's tournament
- 2024 African Sitting Volleyball Championships – Women's tournament
- 2024 Paralympic Final Qualification Tournament – Men's tournament
- 2024 Paralympic Final Qualification Tournament – Women's tournament
- 2024 World ParaVolley Women's Super 6
- Sitting volleyball at the 2024 Summer Paralympics
