= 2022 Sitting Volleyball World Championships – Men's event =

2022 WPV Sitting Volleyball World Championships – Men's event

Tournament details
- Host country: Bosnia and Herzegovina
- City: Sarajevo
- Dates: 4–11 November
- Teams: 16 (from 4 confederations)
- Venue: 1 (in 1 host city)

Final positions
- Champions: Iran (8th title)
- Runners-up: Bosnia and Herzegovina
- Third place: Brazil
- Fourth place: Egypt

The 2022 Sitting Volleyball World Championships – Men's event was the 13th edition of this tournament. For the first time, the competition was held in Sarajevo, Bosnia and Herzegovina. The winners secure a ticket to the 2024 Summer Paralympics. Iran were the defending champions and successfully defended their title triumphing over Bosnia and Herzegovina in straight sets.

== Host selection ==
- China, (Hangzhou) (original hosts but withdrew)
- Bosnia and Herzegovina (Sarajevo)

Originally, the tournament was supposed to be in Hangzhou, China on the 18–24 May. But due to the COVID-19 pandemic, the tournament was postponed and China had to withdraw as hosts.

On 1 April 2022, the Bosnian capital, Sarajevo, was awarded the hosting rights in the new dates of 4–11 November.

== Qualified teams ==
The teams who were invited to participate are as follows, the numbers next to the countries are their world rankings prior to the tournament:

Africa (2)

- Egypt (5)
- Rwanda (14)

Americas (3)

- Brazil (4)
- Canada (13)
- United States (10)

Asia (4)

- Kazakhstan (9)
- Iran (1)
- Iraq (Note: Iraq replaced China, who withdrew due to the COVID-19 pandemic.) (17)
- Japan (11)

Europe (7)

- Bosnia and Herzegovina (H) (2)
- Croatia (12)
- Germany (8)
- Netherlands (15)
- Poland (16)
- Serbia (21)
- Ukraine (7)

== Seeding ==
The seeding and groups were as follows:

Pool A	Pool B	Pool C	Pool D
Bosnia and Herzegovina (1); United States (8); Japan (9); Serbia (16)	Iran (2); Kazakhstan (7); Croatia (10); Iraq (15)	Brazil (3); Germany (6); Canada (11); Poland (14)	Egypt (4); Ukraine (5); Rwanda (12); Netherlands (13)

== Venue ==
The venue was the Arena Hotel Hills in Sarajevo.

2022 Sitting Volleyball World Championships – Men's event is located in Bosnia and Herzegovina	Sarajevo
2022 Sitting Volleyball World Championships – Men's event is located in Bosnia and Herzegovina	Arena Hotel Hills
2022 Sitting Volleyball World Championships – Men's event is located in Bosnia and Herzegovina	Capacity: unknown

== Broadcasting rights ==
Radio and Television of Bosnia and Herzegovina (BHRT) is the host broadcaster for the 2022 WPV Sitting Volleyball World Championships. The games involving Bosnia and Herzegovina were broadcast on (BHRT), while every game not broadcast is on YouTube.

== Format ==
16 teams are split into four groups of four, where every team advances to the Round of 16. In the Round of 16, teams who finished 1st play the teams that finished fourth, and the teams who finished 2nd play the teams that finished third. The eight winners advance to the Quarter Finals, while the eight losers play in a 9–16 classification bracket.

== Group stage ==
=== Pool A ===
Pos	Team	Pld	W	L	Pts	SW	SL	SR	SPW	SPL	SPR
1	Bosnia and Herzegovina (H)	3	3	0	9	9	1	9.000	249	160	1.556
2	United States	3	2	1	6	7	3	2.333	227	199	1.141
3	Serbia	3	1	2	3	3	6	0.500	171	205	0.834
4	Japan	3	0	3	0	0	9	0.000	140	225	0.622

(H) Host

Date	Time		Score		Set 1	Set 2	Set 3	Set 4	Set 5	Total	Report
4 Nov	15:30	Bosnia and Herzegovina	3–0	Serbia	25–17	25–7	25–22			75–46	
4 Nov	17:30	United States	3–0	Japan	25–19	25–15	25–14			75–48	
5 Nov	09:00	Serbia	3–0	Japan	25–14	25–18	25–23			75–55	
5 Nov	19:30	Bosnia and Herzegovina	3–1	United States	25–17	25–13	24–26	25–21		99–77	
6 Nov	09:15	Japan	0–3	Bosnia and Herzegovina	8–25	14–25	15–25			37–75	
6 Nov	15:45	United States	3–0	Serbia	25–17	25–22	25–13			75–52	

=== Pool B ===
Pos	Team	Pld	W	L	Pts	SW	SL	SR	SPW	SPL	SPR
1	Iran	3	3	0	9	9	0	MAX	225	129	1.744
2	Kazakhstan	3	2	1	6	6	3	2.000	187	190	0.984
3	Iraq	3	1	2	3	3	7	0.429	184	224	0.821
4	Croatia	3	0	3	0	1	9	0.111	189	242	0.781

Date	Time		Score		Set 1	Set 2	Set 3	Set 4	Set 5	Total	Report
4 Nov	15:45	Iran	3–0	Iraq	25–11	25–17	25–15			75–43	
4 Nov	17:30	Kazakhstan	3–0	Croatia	25–21	25–22	25–23			75–66	
5 Nov	09:15	Iraq	3–1	Croatia	25–16	25–12	17–25	25–21		92–74	
5 Nov	18:45	Iran	3–0	Kazakhstan	25–12	25–18	25–7			75–37	
6 Nov	18:45	Kazakhstan	3–0	Iraq	25–13	25–17	25–19			75–49	
6 Nov	19:00	Croatia	0–3	Iran	18–25	15–25	16–25			49–75	

=== Pool C ===
Pos	Team	Pld	W	L	Pts	SW	SL	SR	SPW	SPL	SPR
1	Brazil	3	3	0	8	9	2	4.500	255	188	1.356
2	Germany	3	2	1	7	8	3	2.667	247	210	1.176
3	Canada	3	1	2	3	3	6	0.500	183	211	0.867
4	Poland	3	0	3	0	0	9	0.000	149	225	0.662

Date	Time		Score		Set 1	Set 2	Set 3	Set 4	Set 5	Total	Report
4 Nov	15:30	Germany	3–0	Canada	25–15	25–22	25–15			75–52	
4 Nov	17:30	Brazil	3–0	Poland	25–16	25–8	25–11			75–35	
5 Nov	11:30	Poland	0–3	Canada	23–25	16–25	22–25			61–75	
5 Nov	15:45	Brazil	3–2	Germany	23–25	25–19	17–25	25–18	15–10	105–97	
6 Nov	11:30	Germany	3–0	Poland	25–18	25–16	25–19			75–53	
6 Nov	11:45	Canada	0–3	Brazil	23–25	14–25	19–25			56–75	

=== Pool D ===
Pos	Team	Pld	W	L	Pts	SW	SL	SR	SPW	SPL	SPR
1	Egypt	3	3	0	9	9	1	9.000	249	177	1.407
2	Ukraine	3	2	1	6	7	3	2.333	231	184	1.255
3	Netherlands	3	1	2	2	3	8	0.375	207	158	1.310
4	Rwanda	3	0	3	1	2	9	0.222	206	163	1.264

Date	Time		Score		Set 1	Set 2	Set 3	Set 4	Set 5	Total	Report
4 Nov	17:45	Egypt	3–0	Netherlands	25–11	25–19	25–19			75–49	
4 Nov	19:45	Ukraine	3–0	Rwanda	25–20	25–15	25–22			75–57	
5 Nov	11:45	Netherlands	3–2	Rwanda	20–25	25–20	25–22	23–25	15–11	108–103	
5 Nov	15:30	Egypt	3–1	Ukraine	25–15	24–26	25–17	25–23		99–81	
6 Nov	09:00	Rwanda	0–3	Egypt	19–25	15–25	12–25			46–75	
6 Nov	15:30	Ukraine	3–0	Netherlands	25–18	25–17	25–15			75–50	

== Knockout stage ==
=== Bracket ===
Round of 16
7 November
Bosnia and Herzegovina	3
Croatia	0
7 November
Kazakhstan	3
Serbia	0
7 November
Egypt	3
Poland	0
7 November
Germany	3
Netherlands	0
7 November
Iran	3
Japan	0
7 November
United States	3
Iraq	2
7 November
Brazil	3
Rwanda	0
7 November
Ukraine	3
Canada	1

Quarterfinals
8 November
Bosnia and Herzegovina	3
Kazakhstan	0
8 November
Egypt	3
Germany	1
8 November
Iran	3
United States	0
8 November
Brazil	3
Ukraine	0

Semifinals
9 November
Bosnia and Herzegovina	3
Egypt	0
9 November
Iran	3
Brazil	0

Gold Medal match
11 November
Bosnia and Herzegovina	0
Iran	3
3rd place match
11 November
Egypt	1
Brazil	3

=== Classification rounds ===
5–8th place bracket

5–8th place semifinals
9 November
Kazakhstan	1
Germany	3
9 November
United States	3
Ukraine	1

Fifth place
10 November
Germany	3
United States	0
Seventh place
10 November
Kazakhstan	3
Ukraine	2

9–16th place bracket

9–16th place quarterfinals
8 November
Serbia	0
Croatia	3
8 November
Netherlands	2
Poland	3
8 November
Iraq	3
Japan	0
8 November
Canada	3
Rwanda	1

9–12th place semifinals
9 November
Croatia	3
Poland	0
9 November
Iraq	3
Canada	0

Ninth place
10 November
Croatia	1
Iraq	3
Eleventh place
10 November
Poland	2
Canada	3

13–16th place bracket

13–16th place semifinals
9 November
Serbia	1
Netherlands	3
9 November
Japan	0
Rwanda	3

13th place
10 November
Netherlands	0
Rwanda	3
15th place
10 November
Serbia	3
Japan	1

=== Round of 16 ===
Date	Time		Score		Set 1	Set 2	Set 3	Set 4	Set 5	Total	Report
7 Nov	09:00	Iran	3–0	Japan	25–5	25–18	25–9			75–32	
7 Nov	09:15	Brazil	3–0	Rwanda	25–21	25–14	25–10			75–45	
7 Nov	11:30	United States	3–2	Iraq	25–20	25–21	16–25	21–25	15–9	102–100	
7 Nov	11:45	Ukraine	3–1	Canada	25–21	25–23	23–25	26–24		99–93	
7 Nov	15:30	Bosnia and Herzegovina	3–0	Croatia	25–18	25–17	25–19			75–54	
7 Nov	15:45	Egypt	3–0	Poland	25–1	25–11	25–12			75–24	
7 Nov	18:45	Kazakhstan	3–0	Serbia	25–19	25–10	25–15			75–44	
7 Nov	19:00	Germany	3–0	Netherlands	25–10	25–10	25–14			75–34	

=== Quarter Finals ===
Date	Time		Score		Set 1	Set 2	Set 3	Set 4	Set 5	Total	Report
8 Nov	09:00	Iran	3–0	United States	25–18	25–15	25–17			75–50	
8 Nov	11:30	Brazil	3–0	Ukraine	25–14	25–16	25–23			75–53	
8 Nov	15:30	Bosnia and Herzegovina	3–0	Kazakhstan	25–12	26–24	25–18			76–54	
8 Nov	19:00	Egypt	3–1	Germany	27–25	16–25	25–11	25–16		93–77	

=== Semi Finals ===
Date	Time		Score		Set 1	Set 2	Set 3	Set 4	Set 5	Total	Report
9 Nov	15:30	Bosnia and Herzegovina	3–0	Egypt	25–13	25–19	25–20			75–52	
9 Nov	19:00	Iran	3–0	Brazil	25–20	25–20	25–15			75–55	

=== Bronze Medal match ===
Date	Time		Score		Set 1	Set 2	Set 3	Set 4	Set 5	Total	Report
11 Nov	11:45	Egypt	1–3	Brazil	21–25	25–20	23–25	24–26		93–96	

=== Gold Medal match ===
Date	Time		Score		Set 1	Set 2	Set 3	Set 4	Set 5	Total	Report
11 Nov	20:00	Bosnia and Herzegovina	0–3	Iran	24–26	30–32	12–25			66–83	

=== 5–8 Semi Finals ===
Date	Time		Score		Set 1	Set 2	Set 3	Set 4	Set 5	Total	Report
9 Nov	15:45	Ukraine	1–3	United States	25–22	17–25	15–25	8–25		65–97	
9 Nov	18:45	Kazakhstan	2–3	Germany	17–25	25–20	25–23	17–25	9–15	93–108	

=== 7th place match ===
Date	Time		Score		Set 1	Set 2	Set 3	Set 4	Set 5	Total	Report
10 Nov	15:30	Kazakhstan	3–2	Ukraine	25–21	23–25	25–13	23–25	19–17	115–101	

=== 5th place match ===
Date	Time		Score		Set 1	Set 2	Set 3	Set 4	Set 5	Total	Report
19 Nov	15:45	Germany	3–0	United States	25–8	25–16	25–21			75–45	

=== 9–16 Classification games ===
Date	Time		Score		Set 1	Set 2	Set 3	Set 4	Set 5	Total	Report
8 Nov	09:15	Japan	0–3	Iraq	15–25	18–25	20–25			53–75	
8 Nov	11:45	Rwanda	1–3	Canada	25–20	27–29	12–25	22–25		86–99	
8 Nov	15:45	Poland	3–2	Netherlands	25–22	25–22	22–25	23–25	15–8	110–102	
8 Nov	18:45	Croatia	3–0	Serbia	25–13	25–12	25–23			75–48	

=== 9–12 Semi Finals ===
Date	Time		Score		Set 1	Set 2	Set 3	Set 4	Set 5	Total	Report
9 Nov	11:30	Croatia	3–0	Poland	25–18	25–23	25–17			75–58	
9 Nov	11:45	Canada	0–3	Iraq	17–25	22–25	19–25			58–75	

=== 9th place match ===
Date	Time		Score		Set 1	Set 2	Set 3	Set 4	Set 5	Total	Report
10 Nov	11:45	Croatia	1–3	Iraq	25–18	23–25	21–25	23–25		92–93	

=== 11th place match ===
Date	Time		Score		Set 1	Set 2	Set 3	Set 4	Set 5	Total	Report
10 Nov	11:30	Poland	2–3	Canada	26–24	26–24	14–25	17–25	14–16	97–114	

=== 13–16 Semi Finals ===
Date	Time		Score		Set 1	Set 2	Set 3	Set 4	Set 5	Total	Report
9 Nov	09:00	Serbia	1–3	Netherlands	15–25	25–17	20–25	23–25		83–92	
9 Nov	09:15	Rwanda	3–0	Japan	25–22	25–22	25–21			75–65	

=== 13th place match ===
Date	Time		Score		Set 1	Set 2	Set 3	Set 4	Set 5	Total	Report
10 Nov	09:15	Netherlands	0–3	Rwanda	22–25	19–25	27–29			68–79	

=== 15th place match ===
Date	Time		Score		Set 1	Set 2	Set 3	Set 4	Set 5	Total	Report
10 Nov	09:00	Serbia	3–1	Japan	28–26	21–25	25–19	25–23		99–93	

== Final standing ==
Rank	Team
1st place, gold medalist(s)	Iran
2nd place, silver medalist(s)	Bosnia and Herzegovina
3rd place, bronze medalist(s)	Brazil
4	Egypt
5	Kazakhstan
6	Ukraine
7	Germany
8	United States
9	Iraq
10	Croatia
11	Canada
12	Poland
13	Rwanda
14	Netherlands
15	Serbia
16	Japan

Qualified for the 2024 Summer Paralympics

== See also ==
- 2022 Sitting Volleyball World Championships – Women's event
- 2023 Sitting Volleyball European Championships – Men's event
- 2023 Sitting Volleyball European Championships – Women's event
- 2023 Asia and Oceania Sitting Volleyball Championships
- 2023 Pan American Sitting Volleyball Championships
- 2024 African Sitting Volleyball Championships – Men's tournament
- 2024 African Sitting Volleyball Championships – Women's tournament
- 2023 Sitting Volleyball World Cup – Men's event
- 2023 Sitting Volleyball World Cup – Women's event
- 2024 Paralympic Final Qualification Tournament – Men's tournament
- 2024 Paralympic Final Qualification Tournament – Women's tournament
- 2024 World ParaVolley Women's Super 6
- Sitting volleyball at the 2024 Summer Paralympics
