= 2023 Asia and Oceania Sitting Volleyball Championships =

Tournament details
- Host country: Kazakhstan
- City: Astana
- Dates: 3–8 July
- Venue: 1 (in 1 host city)

The 2023 Asia and Oceania Sitting Volleyball Championships was the 5th edition (7th including unofficial championships) of the championship and decided who took the Asia spot in the Sitting Volleyball tournament at the 2024 Summer Paralympics. The tournament was held in the Kazakh capital of Astana. The winners of the men's tournament was Iran's men, while China won the women's event.

== Teams ==
The countries were drawn on 22 June 2023.

=== Men's competition ===
- China
- India (Note: India replaced Thailand, who withdrew prior to the event.)
- Iran
- Iraq
- Japan
- Kazakhstan
- South Korea
- Thailand (withdrew)

=== Women's competition ===
- China
- India
- Iran
- Japan
- Kazakhstan
- South Korea
- Mongolia
- Thailand

== Venue ==
The venue was the Jekpe-Jek Sports Centre in Astana.

2023 Asia and Oceania Sitting Volleyball Championships is located in Kazakhstan	Astana
2023 Asia and Oceania Sitting Volleyball Championships is located in Kazakhstan	Jekpe-Jek Sports Centre
2023 Asia and Oceania Sitting Volleyball Championships is located in Kazakhstan	Capacity: unknown

== Broadcasting rights ==
The games were live streamed on the ParaVolley Asia Oceania Youtube channel while some games were broadcast on Kazakh TV channel, Qazsport.

== Men's event ==
2023 Asia and Oceania Sitting Volleyball Championships
Tournament details
- Host country: Kazakhstan
- City: Astana
- Dates: 3–8 July
- Teams: 7
- Venue: 1 (in 1 host city)
- Runners-up: Kazakhstan
- Third place: China
- Fourth place: Iraq

Tournament statistics
- Matches played: 15

The seven teams where divided into two groups where the top two from each group advanced to the semifinals.

=== Group A ===
Pos	Team	Pld	W	L	Pts	SW	SL	SR	SPW	SPL	SPR	Qualification
1	Kazakhstan (H)	2	2	0	6	6	0	MAX	150	75	2.000	Semifinals
2	Iraq	2	1	1	3	3	4	0.750	132	163	0.810	Semifinals
3	Japan	2	0	2	0	1	6	0.167	122	168	0.726	

(H) Host

Date	Time		Score		Set 1	Set 2	Set 3	Set 4	Set 5	Total	Report
3 July	10:00	Kazakhstan	3–0	Japan	25–5	25–16	25–15			75–36	
4 July	10:00	Japan	1–3	Iraq	18–25	25–18	20–25	23–25		86–93	
5 July	10:00	Iraq	0–3	Kazakhstan	15–25	10–25	14–25			39–75	

=== Group B ===
Pos	Team	Pld	W	L	Pts	SW	SL	SR	SPW	SPL	SPR	Qualification
1	Iran	3	3	0	9	9	0	MAX	225	119	1.891	Semifinals
2	China	3	2	1	6	6	3	2.000	194	160	1.213	Semifinals
3	South Korea	3	1	2	3	3	6	0.500	168	196	0.857	
4	India	3	0	3	0	0	9	0.000	113	225	0.502	

Date	Time		Score		Set 1	Set 2	Set 3	Set 4	Set 5	Total	Report
3 July	15:30	Iran	3–0	India	25–5	25–15	25–11			75–31	
3 July	17:00	China	3–0	South Korea	25–8	25–20	25–21			75–49	
4 July	11:30	India	0–3	South Korea	12–25	20–25	14–25			46–75	
4 July	15:30	Iran	3–0	China	25–19	25–8	25–17			75–44	
5 July	11:30	China	3–0	India	25–10	25–8	25–18			75–36	
5 July	15:30	South Korea	0–3	Iran	11–25	21–25	12–25			44–75	

=== Knockout stage ===
Semifinals
6 July
Kazakhstan	3
China	2
6 July
Iran	3
Iraq	0

Final
8 July
Kazakhstan	0
Iran	3
Third place
8 July
China	3
Iraq	1

=== Semi finals ===
Date	Time		Score		Set 1	Set 2	Set 3	Set 4	Set 5	Total	Report
6 July	15:00	Kazakhstan	3–2	China	21–25	25–21	19–25	25–21	15–12	105–104	
6 July	17:30	Iran	3–0	Iraq	25–10	25–7	25–15			75–32	

=== 3rd place match ===
Date	Time		Score		Set 1	Set 2	Set 3	Set 4	Set 5	Total	Report
8 July	11:30	China	3–1	Iraq	16–25	25–15	25–22	25–13		91–75	

=== Final ===
Date	Time		Score		Set 1	Set 2	Set 3	Set 4	Set 5	Total	Report
8 July	16:30	Iran	3–0	Kazakhstan	21–25	14–25	17–25			52–75	

=== Classification rounds ===
5–7th place semifinal
6 July
Japan	3
India	0

5th place
7 July
South Korea	3
Japan	2

=== 5–7th place semifinal ===
Date	Time		Score		Set 1	Set 2	Set 3	Set 4	Set 5	Total	Report
6 July	10:00	Japan	3–0	India	25–12	25–15	25–9			75–36	

=== 5th place match ===
Date	Time		Score		Set 1	Set 2	Set 3	Set 4	Set 5	Total	Report
7 July	10:00	Japan	2–3	South Korea	23–25	21–25	25–20	25–19	10–15	104–104	

=== Final rankings ===
Rank	Team
Gold medal	Iran (Note: Iran already made the Paralympics because they won the 2022 World Championships. Therefore the Asia spot was given to the runners up, Kazakhstan.)
Silver medal	Kazakhstan
Bronze medal	China
4	Iraq
5	South Korea
6	Japan
7	India

Team Qualified for the 2024 Paralympics

== Women's event ==
2023 Asia and Oceania Sitting Volleyball Championships
Tournament details
- Host country: Kazakhstan
- City: Astana
- Dates: 3–8 July
- Teams: 8
- Venue: 1 (in 1 host city)
- Runners-up: Iran
- Third place: Japan
- Fourth place: South Korea

Tournament statistics
- Matches played: 20

The eight teams where divided into two groups where the top two from each group advanced to the semifinals.

=== Group A ===
Pos	Team	Pld	W	L	Pts	SW	SL	SR	SPW	SPL	SPR	Qualification
1	Iran	3	3	0	9	9	0	MAX	225	58	3.879	Semifinals
2	South Korea	3	2	1	5	6	5	1.200	201	197	1.020	Semifinals
3	Kazakhstan (H)	3	1	2	4	5	6	0.833	185	218	0.849	
4	India	3	0	3	0	0	9	0.000	87	225	0.387	

(H) Host

Date	Time		Score		Set 1	Set 2	Set 3	Set 4	Set 5	Total	Report
3 July	12:15	Kazakhstan	3–0	India	25–17	25–11	25–9			75–37	
3 July	15:00	Iran	3–0	South Korea	25–11	25–3	25–6			75–20	
4 July	09:30	India	0–3	South Korea	8–25	18–25	8–25			34–75	
4 July	16:30	Kazakhstan	0–3	Iran	8–25	7–25	7–25			22–75	
5 July	11:00	Iran	3–0	India	25–2	25–10	25–4			75–16	
5 July	15:00	South Korea	3–2	Kazakhstan	25–13	21–25	20–25	25–14	15–11	106–88	

=== Group B ===
Pos	Team	Pld	W	L	Pts	SW	SL	SR	SPW	SPL	SPR	Qualification
1	China	3	3	0	9	9	0	MAX	225	56	4.018	Semifinals
2	Japan	3	2	1	6	6	4	1.500	191	182	1.049	Semifinals
3	Thailand	3	1	2	3	4	7	0.571	174	218	0.798	
4	Mongolia	3	0	3	0	1	9	0.111	144	247	0.583	

Date	Time		Score		Set 1	Set 2	Set 3	Set 4	Set 5	Total	Report
3 July	16:30	China	3–0	Thailand	25–3	25–8	25–1			75–12	
3 July	18:00	Japan	3–0	Mongolia	25–15	25–14	25–13			75–42	
4 July	11:00	China	3–0	Japan	25–6	25–8	25–6			75–20	
4 July	15:00	Thailand	3–1	Mongolia	25–15	21–25	26–24	25–14		97–78	
5 July	09:30	Japan	3–1	Thailand	25–16	25–10	21–25	25–14		96–65	
5 July	16:30	Mongolia	0–3	China	7–25	12–25	5–25			24–75	

=== Knockout stage ===
Semifinals
6 July
Iran	3
Japan	0
6 July
China	3
South Korea	0

Final
8 July
Iran	0
China	3
Third place
8 July
Japan	3
South Korea	0

=== Semi finals ===
Date	Time		Score		Set 1	Set 2	Set 3	Set 4	Set 5	Total	Report
6 July	14:00	Iran	3–0	Japan	25–16	25–7	25–12			75–35	
6 July	17:00	China	3–0	South Korea	25–1	25–3	25–2			75–6	

=== 3rd place match ===
Date	Time		Score		Set 1	Set 2	Set 3	Set 4	Set 5	Total	Report
8 July	09:30	Japan	3–0	South Korea	25–7	25–5	25–9			75–21	

=== Final ===
Date	Time		Score		Set 1	Set 2	Set 3	Set 4	Set 5	Total	Report
8 July	14:30	Iran	0–3	China	12–25	15–25	11–25			38–75	

=== 5–8 place bracket ===
5–8 Semifinals
6 July
Kazakhstan	0
Mongolia	3
6 July
Thailand	3
India	0

5th place match
8 July
Mongolia	0
Thailand	3
7th place match
8 July
Kazakhstan	3
India	0

=== 5–8 Semi finals ===
Date	Time		Score		Set 1	Set 2	Set 3	Set 4	Set 5	Total	Report
6 July	09:30	Kazakhstan	0–3	Mongolia	10–25	12–21	14–25			36–71	
6 July	11:00	Thailand	3–0	India	25–23	25–8	25–5			75–36	

=== 7th place match ===
Date	Time		Score		Set 1	Set 2	Set 3	Set 4	Set 5	Total	Report
8 July	09:30	Kazakhstan	3–0	India	25–16	25–3	25–8			75–27	

=== 5th place match ===
Date	Time		Score		Set 1	Set 2	Set 3	Set 4	Set 5	Total	Report
8 July	11:30	Mongolia	0–3	Thailand	24–26	26–28	21–25			71–79	

=== Final rankings ===
Rank	Team
Gold medal	China
Silver medal	Iran
Bronze medal	Japan
4	South Korea
5	Thailand
6	Mongolia
7	Kazakhstan
8	India

Team Qualified for the 2024 Paralympics

== See also ==
- 2023 Sitting Volleyball European Championships – Men's event
- 2023 Sitting Volleyball European Championships – Women's event
- 2022 Sitting Volleyball World Championships – Men's event
- 2022 Sitting Volleyball World Championships – Women's event
- 2023 Pan American Sitting Volleyball Championships
- 2024 African Sitting Volleyball Championships – Men's tournament
- 2024 African Sitting Volleyball Championships – Women's tournament
- 2023 Sitting Volleyball World Cup – Men's event
- 2023 Sitting Volleyball World Cup – Women's event
- 2024 Paralympic Final Qualification Tournament – Men's tournament
- 2024 Paralympic Final Qualification Tournament – Women's tournament
- 2024 World ParaVolley Women's Super 6
- Sitting volleyball at the 2024 Summer Paralympics
