= 2024 Women's Sitting Volleyball Paralympic Final Qualification Tournament =

2024 Paralympic Final Qualification Tournament – Women's tournament

Tournament details
- Host country: China
- City: Dali
- Dates: 3–10 April
- Teams: 6 (from 3 confederations)
- Venue: 1 (in 1 host city)

Final positions
- Champions: Slovenia (th title)
- Runners-up: Iran
- Third place: Ukraine
- Fourth place: Germany

Tournament statistics
- Matches played: 16

The 2024 Women's Sitting Volleyball Paralympic Final Qualification Tournament was held in Dali, China. The winners qualify for the 2024 Summer Paralympics. Slovenia won the event and qualified for the 2024 Summer Paralympics after winning all their games and defeating Iran 3–2 in the final.

== Host selection ==
A call for the hosting rights was first said on 14 February 2023 by World ParaVolley, before reiterating the call on 9 May 2023. On 31 May 2023, The Yunnan regional government gave funding for the event to be held in Dali. Dali, China was given the hosting rights on 27 October 2023.

== Teams ==
Seven countries entered this event. Although Mongolia withdrew to reduce the teams to six. Since hosts China havs already qualified for the Paralympics, they will play exhibition games against each team.

- China (hosts and played friendlies against the participating teams)
- Germany
- Iran
- Japan
- Mongolia (withdrew)
- Slovenia
- Thailand
- Ukraine

== Venue ==
The venue is the Dali International Olympic Sports Centre in Dali.

2024 Women's Sitting Volleyball Paralympic Final Qualification Tournament is located in China	Dali
2024 Women's Sitting Volleyball Paralympic Final Qualification Tournament is located in China	Dali International Olympic Sports Centre
2024 Women's Sitting Volleyball Paralympic Final Qualification Tournament is located in China	Capacity: 5,000

== Squads ==
Teams can select 12 players for the tournament.

== Format ==
The six teams all play each other in one group where the top two will advance to the final. Hosts China, who have already made the Paralympics, will play friendly matches against each team.

== Group stage ==
Pos	Team	Pld	W	L	Pts	SW	SL	SR	SPW	SPL	SPR	Qualification
1	Slovenia	5	5	0	14	15	3	5.000	423	329	1.286	Final
2	Iran	5	3	2	10	11	6	1.833	388	297	1.306	Final
3	Ukraine	5	3	2	10	13	8	1.625	462	394	1.173	
4	Germany	5	3	2	8	10	8	1.250	383	378	1.013	
5	Japan	5	1	4	3	3	12	0.250	278	342	0.813	
6	Thailand	5	0	5	0	0	15	0.000	142	300	0.473	
7	Mongolia	0	0	0	0	0	0	—	0	0	—	Withdrew

Source: Report
- All times are local.

Date	Time		Score		Set 1	Set 2	Set 3	Set 4	Set 5	Total	Report
April 3	11:00	Ukraine	3–0	Thailand	25–7	25–23	25–11	–	–	75–41	
April 3	14:00	Japan	0–3	Iran	7–25	19–25	6–25	–	–	32–75	
April 4	09:00	Thailand	0–3	Japan	18–25	11–25	11–25	–	–	40–75	
April 4	14:00	Slovenia	3–1	Germany	25–13	25–20	20–25	25–17	–	95–75	
April 5	09:00	Ukraine	2–3	Slovenia	24–26	19–25	25–18	25–18	12–15	105–102	
April 5	14:00	Iran	3–0	Thailand	25–11	25–3	25–14	–	–	75–28	
April 6	11:00	Slovenia	3–0	Japan	25–18	25–13	25–19	–	–	75–50	
April 6	14:00	Germany	3–2	Ukraine	21–25	25–17	25–22	14–25	15–13	100–102	
April 7	09:00	Japan	0–3	Germany	23–25	21–25	22–25	–	–	66–75	
April 7	11:00	Iran	0–3	Slovenia	22–25	20–25	24–26	–	–	66–76	
April 8	09:00	Slovenia	3–0	Thailand	25–12	25–12	25–9	–	–	75–33	
April 8	11:00	Germany	0–3	Iran	13–25	24–26	21–25	–	–	58–76	
April 8	14:00	Ukraine	3–0	Japan	25–18	25–12	27–25	–	–	77–55	
April 9	09:00	Iran	2–3	Ukraine	20–25	25–20	25–18	13–25	13–15	96–103	
April 9	11:00	Thailand	0–3	Germany	9–25	13–25	17–25	–	–	39–75	

Games involving China

Date	Time		Score		Set 1	Set 2	Set 3	Set 4	Set 5	Total	Report
April 3	09:00	Germany	0–3	China	22–25	18–25	9–25	–	–	49–75	
April 4	11:00	China	3–0	Ukraine	25–16	25–18	25–20	–	–	75–54	
April 5	11:00	Japan	0–3	China	9–25	8–25	11–25	–	–	28–75	
April 6	09:00	China	3–0	Iran	25–17	25–11	25–13	–	–	75–41	
April 7	14:00	Thailand	0–3	China	11–25	10–25	8–25	–	–	29–75	
April 9	14:00	China	3–0	Slovenia	25–11	25–20	25–16	–	–	75–47	

== Knockout stage ==
Final
April 10
Slovenia	3
Iran	2

Date	Time		Score		Set 1	Set 2	Set 3	Set 4	Set 5	Total	Report
April 10	09:00	Slovenia	3–2	Iran	25–13	11–25	25–22	23–25	15–13	99–98	

== Final rankings ==
Rank	Team
Gold medal	Slovenia
Silver medal	Iran
Bronze medal	Ukraine
4	Germany
5	Japan
6	Thailand

Team Qualified for the 2024 Paralympics

== See also ==
- 2024 Paralympic Final Qualification Tournament – Men's tournament
- 2023 Sitting Volleyball European Championships – Men's event
- 2023 Sitting Volleyball European Championships – Women's event
- 2022 Sitting Volleyball World Championships – Men's event
- 2022 Sitting Volleyball World Championships – Women's event
- 2023 Asia and Oceania Sitting Volleyball Championships
- 2023 Pan American Sitting Volleyball Championships
- 2023 Sitting Volleyball World Cup – Men's event
- 2023 Sitting Volleyball World Cup – Women's event
- 2024 African Sitting Volleyball Championships – Women's tournament
- 2024 African Sitting Volleyball Championships – Men's tournament
- 2024 World ParaVolley Women's Super 6
- Sitting volleyball at the 2024 Summer Paralympics
