= 2023 Sitting Volleyball European Championships – Women's event =

Volleyball competition held in Italy

Tournament details
- Host country: Italy
- City: Caorle
- Dates: 9–15 October
- Teams: 10
- Venue: 1 (in 1 host city)

Final positions
- Champions: Italy (1st title)
- Runners-up: Slovenia
- Third place: Ukraine
- Fourth place: Germany

Tournament statistics
- Matches played: 33

The 2023 Sitting Volleyball European Championships – Women's event was the 16th edition of this tournament. For the first time, the competition was held in Caorle, Italy. The winners qualify for the 2024 Summer Paralympics. The reigning champions are Russia, but their disqualification due to their invasion of Ukraine means they can't defend their title. Italy won their first title, beating Slovenia 3–1 in the final.

== Host selection ==
Caorle, Italy was given the hosting rights on the 8 February 2023. This marks the first time the tournament will be held in Italy.

== Qualified teams ==
Host (1)

- Italy

Qualifiers (9)

- Croatia
- France
- Germany
- Great Britain
- Hungary
- Poland
- Slovenia
- Turkey
- Ukraine

== Venue ==
The venue was the Palamare Valter Vicentini in Caorle.

2023 Sitting Volleyball European Championships – Women's event is located in Italy	Caorle
2023 Sitting Volleyball European Championships – Women's event is located in Italy	Palamare Valter Vicentini
2023 Sitting Volleyball European Championships – Women's event is located in Italy	Capacity: unknown

== Broadcasting rights ==
Every game will be broadcast on ParaVolley Europe YouTube channel.

== Squads ==
Teams can select 12 players for the tournament.

== Draw ==
The draw took place on 13 May 2023 in Caorle.

== Format ==
10 teams are split into two group of five. The top four in each group plays in the Quarterfinals, while the bottom team in each group plays in the classification match.

== Group stage ==
=== Pool A ===
- All times are local.

Pos	Team	Pld	W	L	Pts	SW	SL	SR	SPW	SPL	SPR	Qualification
1	Italy (H)	4	4	0	12	12	0	MAX	301	130	2.315	Quarterfinals
2	Germany	4	3	1	9	9	3	3.000	284	220	1.291	Quarterfinals
3	Hungary	4	2	2	6	6	7	0.857	170	216	0.787	Quarterfinals
4	Croatia	4	1	3	3	3	9	0.333	158	267	0.592	Quarterfinals
5	Turkey	4	0	4	0	1	12	0.083	144	324	0.444	

Source: Report
(H) Host

Date	Time		Score		Set 1	Set 2	Set 3	Set 4	Set 5	Total	Report
9 Oct	09:30	Germany	3–0	Croatia	25–8	25–3	25–8			75–19	
9 Oct	19:00	Italy	3–0	Turkey	25–2	25–6	25–5			75–13	
10 Oct	12:00	Germany	3–0	Hungary	25–11	25–11	25–11			75–33	
10 Oct	19:00	Italy	3–0	Croatia	25–4	25–7	25–9			75–20	
11 Oct	12:00	Turkey	1–3	Hungary	12–25	6–25	26–24	12–25		56–99	
11 Oct	19:00	Italy	3–0	Germany	25–21	25–14	26–24			76–59	
12 Oct	09:15	Hungary	3–0	Croatia	25–14	25–19	25–11			75–44	
12 Oct	12:00	Germany	3–0	Turkey	25–8	25–20	25–5			75–33	
12 Oct	19:00	Hungary	0–3	Italy	13–25	10–25	15–25			38–75	
13 Oct	09:30	Croatia	3–0	Turkey	25–11	25–14	25–17			75–42	

=== Pool B ===
Pos	Team	Pld	W	L	Pts	SW	SL	SR	SPW	SPL	SPR	Qualification
1	Slovenia	4	4	0	12	12	0	MAX	301	189	1.593	Quarterfinals
2	Ukraine	4	3	1	9	9	3	3.000	303	196	1.546	Quarterfinals
3	Poland	4	2	2	6	6	6	1.000	278	283	0.982	Quarterfinals
4	Great Britain	4	1	3	3	3	10	0.300	202	310	0.652	Quarterfinals
5	France	4	0	4	0	1	12	0.083	193	309	0.625	

Source: Report

Date	Time		Score		Set 1	Set 2	Set 3	Set 4	Set 5	Total	Report
9 Oct	12:00	Ukraine	3–0	Poland	27–25	25–16	25–15			77–56	
9 Oct	16:00	Slovenia	3–0	Great Britain	25–12	25–5	25–11			75–28	
10 Oct	09:30	Ukraine	3–0	France	25–4	25–11	25–15			75–30	
10 Oct	16:00	Slovenia	3–0	Poland	25–21	25–20	25–19			75–60	
11 Oct	09:30	Great Britain	3–1	France	25–21	25–21	9–25	25–16		84–83	
11 Oct	16:00	Slovenia	3–0	Ukraine	26–24	25–20	25–19			76–63	
12 Oct	09:30	France	0–3	Poland	23–25	7–25	11–25			41–75	
12 Oct	11:45	Ukraine	3–0	Great Britain	25–11	25–9	25–14			75–34	
12 Oct	18:15	France	0–3	Slovenia	11–25	11–25	16–25			38–75	
13 Oct	09:15	Poland	3–0	Great Britain	25–21	27–25	25–10			77–56	

== Knockout stage ==
Quarter-finals
13 October –
Italy	3
Great Britain	0
13 October –
Ukraine	3
Hungary	0
13 October –
Slovenia	3
Croatia	0
13 October –
Germany	3
Poland	0

Semi-finals
14 October –
Italy	3
Ukraine	2
14 October –
Slovenia	3
Germany	1

Final
15 October –
Italy	3
Slovenia	1
Third place
15 October –
Ukraine	3
Germany	1

=== 5–8 classification bracket ===
Semifinals
14 October
Great Britain	0
Hungary	3
14 October
Croatia	3
Poland	2

5th place match
15 October
Hungary	3
Croatia	0
7th place match
15 October
Great Britain	0
Poland	3

=== Ninth place match ===
9th place
14 October
Turkey	1
France	3

=== Quarterfinals ===
Date	Time		Score		Set 1	Set 2	Set 3	Set 4	Set 5	Total	Report
13 Oct	16:00	Ukraine	3–0	Hungary	25–7	25–14	25–8			75–29	
13 Oct	18:00	Germany	3–0	Poland	25–8	25–10	25–10			75–28	
13 Oct	18:15	Italy	3–0	Great Britain	25–9	25–12	25–5			75–26	
13 Oct	18:30	Slovenia	3–0	Croatia	25–10	25–5	25–14			75–29	

=== Semifinals ===
Date	Time		Score		Set 1	Set 2	Set 3	Set 4	Set 5	Total	Report
14 Oct	15:45	Italy	3–2	Ukraine	22–25	17–25	25–19	25–19	15–13	104–101	
14 Oct	16:00	Slovenia	3–1	Germany	25–15	23–25	25–19	25–19		98–78	

=== Third place match ===
Date	Time		Score		Set 1	Set 2	Set 3	Set 4	Set 5	Total	Report
15 Oct	12:00	Ukraine	3–1	Germany	25–17	21–25	26–24	25–12	–	97–78	

=== Final ===
Date	Time		Score		Set 1	Set 2	Set 3	Set 4	Set 5	Total	Report
15 Oct	15:00	Italy	3–1	Slovenia	25–17	22–25	25–16	25–22		97–80	

=== Ninth place match ===
Date	Time		Score		Set 1	Set 2	Set 3	Set 4	Set 5	Total	Report
14 Oct	15:30	Turkey	1–3	France	25–20	25–27	18–25	15–25	–	83–97	

=== 5–8 Semifinals ===
Date	Time		Score		Set 1	Set 2	Set 3	Set 4	Set 5	Total	Report
14 Oct	09:30	Great Britain	0–3	Hungary	18–25	18–25	23–25			59–75	
14 Oct	16:00	Croatia	3–2	Poland	25–23	26–24	15–25	16–25	15–13	97–110	

=== Seventh place match ===
Date	Time		Score		Set 1	Set 2	Set 3	Set 4	Set 5	Total	Report
15 Oct	09:00	Great Britain	0–3	Poland	12–25	7–25	14–25			33–75	

=== Fifth place match ===
Date	Time		Score		Set 1	Set 2	Set 3	Set 4	Set 5	Total	Report
15 Oct	11:00	Hungary	3–0	Croatia	25–20	25–20	25–21			75–61	

== Final rankings ==
Rank	Team
Gold medal	Italy
Silver medal	Slovenia
Bronze medal	Ukraine
4	Germany
5	Hungary
6	Croatia
7	Poland
8	Great Britain
9	France
10	Turkey

Team Qualified for the 2024 Paralympics

== Awards ==
The awards were as follows:

MVP

- (Italy) Francesca Bosio

Best Setter

- (Italy) Giulia Bellandi

Best Attacker

- (Slovenia) Valentyna Brik

Best Receiver

- (Ukraine) Yaroslava Lakatosh

Best Server

- (Germany) Sonja Scholten

Best Blocker

- (Ukraine) Anastasiia Filon

Best Libero

- (Italy) Silivia Biasi

Green Card award

- Poland

== See also ==
- 2023 Sitting Volleyball European Championships – Men's event
- 2022 Sitting Volleyball World Championships – Men's event
- 2022 Sitting Volleyball World Championships – Women's event
- 2023 Asia and Oceania Sitting Volleyball Championships
- 2023 Pan American Sitting Volleyball Championships
- 2024 African Sitting Volleyball Championships – Men's tournament
- 2024 African Sitting Volleyball Championships – Women's tournament
- 2023 Sitting Volleyball World Cup – Men's event
- 2023 Sitting Volleyball World Cup – Women's event
- 2024 Paralympic Final Qualification Tournament – Men's tournament
- 2024 Paralympic Final Qualification Tournament – Women's tournament
- 2024 World ParaVolley Women's Super 6
- Sitting volleyball at the 2024 Summer Paralympics
