= 2024 African Sitting Volleyball Championships – Men's tournament =

Tournament details
- Host country: Nigeria
- City: Lagos
- Dates: 29 January – 3 February
- Teams: 7
- Venue: 1 (in 1 host city)

Final positions
- Champions: Egypt (10th title)
- Runners-up: Morocco
- Third place: Rwanda
- Fourth place: Algeria

Tournament statistics
- Matches played: 14

The 2024 African Sitting Volleyball Championships – Men's tournament was held in Lagos, Nigeria. The winners qualify for the 2024 Summer Paralympics. The defending champions are Egypt. Egypt successfully defended their title with a 3–0 win over Morocco.

== Host selection ==
Lagos, Nigeria was given the hosting rights.

== Qualified teams ==
Eight countries originally entered for this championship, but Zimbabwe withdrew right before the tournament started.

- Algeria
- Egypt
- Kenya
- Libya
- Morocco
- Nigeria (hosts)
- Rwanda
- Zimbabwe (withdrew)

== Venue ==
The venue is the Teslim Balogun Stadium, near the National Stadium in Lagos.

2024 African Sitting Volleyball Championships – Men's tournament is located in Nigeria	Lagos
2024 African Sitting Volleyball Championships – Men's tournament is located in Nigeria	Teslim Balogun Stadium
2024 African Sitting Volleyball Championships – Men's tournament is located in Nigeria	Capacity: unknown

== Squads ==
Teams can select 12 players for the tournament.

== Draw ==
The draw took place on 6 January 2024 in Rabat, Morocco.

== Format ==
The seven teams where divided into two groups where the top two from each group advanced to the semifinals.

== Group stage ==
=== Pool A ===
- All times are local.

Pos	Team	Pld	W	L	Pts	SW	SL	SR	SPW	SPL	SPR	Qualification
1	Egypt	3	3	0	9	9	0	MAX	225	122	1.844	Semifinals
2	Morocco	3	2	1	6	6	4	1.500	217	191	1.136	Semifinals
3	Kenya	3	1	2	2	4	8	0.500	233	268	0.869	Fifth place match
4	Nigeria (H)	3	0	3	1	2	9	0.222	167	261	0.640	

Source: Report
(H) Host

Date	Time		Score		Set 1	Set 2	Set 3	Set 4	Set 5	Total	Report
29 Jan	17:30	Nigeria	2–3	Kenya	22–25	13–25	25–23	25–23	12–15	97–111	
30 Jan	17:00	Egypt	3–0	Morocco	25–17	25–20	25–9			75–46	
31 Jan	10:15	Morocco	3–0	Nigeria	25–14	25–11	25–14			75–39	
31 Jan	15:00	Egypt	3–0	Kenya	25–14	25–23	25–8			75–45	
1 Feb	10:15	Egypt	3–0	Nigeria	25–11	25–10	25–10			75–31	
1 Feb	17:00	Morocco	3–1	Kenya	25–21	21–25	25–14	25–17		96–77	

=== Pool B ===
Pos	Team	Pld	W	L	Pts	SW	SL	SR	SPW	SPL	SPR	Qualification
1	Rwanda	2	2	0	6	6	0	MAX	150	76	1.974	Semifinals
2	Algeria	2	1	1	3	3	3	1.000	119	111	1.072	Semifinals
3	Libya	2	0	2	0	0	6	0.000	68	150	0.453	Fifth place match
4	Zimbabwe	0	0	0	0	0	0	—	0	0	—	Withdrew

Source: Report

Date	Time		Score		Set 1	Set 2	Set 3	Set 4	Set 5	Total	Report
30 Jan	10:00	Rwanda	3–0	Algeria	25–13	25–20	25–11			75–44	
31 Jan	17:00	Algeria	3–0	Libya	25–15	25–6	25–15			75–36	
1 Feb	15:00	Rwanda	3–0	Libya	25–9	25–10	25–13			75–32	

== Knockout stage ==
Semi finals
2 February
Egypt	3
Algeria	0
2 February
Rwanda	2
Morocco	3

Final
3 February
Egypt	3
Morocco	0
Third place
3 February
Algeria	0
Rwanda	3

=== Semi finals ===
Date	Time		Score		Set 1	Set 2	Set 3	Set 4	Set 5	Total	Report
2 Feb	15:00	Egypt	3–0	Algeria	25–11	25–8	25–12			75–31	
2 Feb	17:00	Rwanda	2–3	Morocco	25–23	21–25	25–19	22–25	10–15	103–107	

=== Third place match ===
Date	Time		Score		Set 1	Set 2	Set 3	Set 4	Set 5	Total	Report
3 Feb	10:00	Algeria	0–3	Rwanda	18–25	12–25	16–25			46–75	

=== Final ===
Date	Time		Score		Set 1	Set 2	Set 3	Set 4	Set 5	Total	Report
3 Feb	17:30	Egypt	3–0	Morocco	25–13	25–11	25–16			75–40	

=== Fifth place match ===
5th place
2 February
Kenya	3
Libya	0

Date	Time		Score		Set 1	Set 2	Set 3	Set 4	Set 5	Total	Report
2 Feb	10:00	Kenya	3–0	Libya	25–22	25–14	25–13			75–49	

== Final rankings ==
Rank	Team
Gold medal	Egypt
Silver medal	Morocco
Bronze medal	Rwanda
4	Algeria
5	Kenya
6	Libya
7	Nigeria

Team Qualified for the 2024 Paralympics

== See also ==
- 2024 African Sitting Volleyball Championships – Women's tournament
- 2023 Sitting Volleyball European Championships – Men's event
- 2023 Sitting Volleyball European Championships – Women's event
- 2022 Sitting Volleyball World Championships – Men's event
- 2022 Sitting Volleyball World Championships – Women's event
- 2023 Asia and Oceania Sitting Volleyball Championships
- 2023 Pan American Sitting Volleyball Championships
- 2023 Sitting Volleyball World Cup – Men's event
- 2023 Sitting Volleyball World Cup – Women's event
- 2024 Paralympic Final Qualification Tournament – Men's tournament
- 2024 Paralympic Final Qualification Tournament – Women's tournament
- 2024 World ParaVolley Women's Super 6
- Sitting volleyball at the 2024 Summer Paralympics
