= 2022 Sitting Volleyball World Championships – Women's event =

2022 WPV Sitting Volleyball World Championships – Women's event

Tournament details
- Host country: Bosnia and Herzegovina
- City: Sarajevo
- Dates: 4–11 November
- Teams: 13 (from 4 confederations)
- Venue: 1 (in 1 host city)

Final positions
- Champions: Brazil (1st title)
- Runners-up: Canada
- Third place: United States
- Fourth place: Slovenia

The 2022 Sitting Volleyball World Championships – Women's event was the 8th edition of this tournament. For the first time, the competition was held in Sarajevo, Bosnia and Herzegovina. The winners secure a ticket to the 2024 Summer Paralympics. Russia were the defending champions, but couldn't defend their title due to their suspension because of their invasion of Ukraine. Brazil won their first title, beating Canada, 3–2, in the final.

== Host selection ==
- China, (Hangzhou) (original hosts but withdrew)
- Bosnia and Herzegovina (Sarajevo)

Originally, the tournament was supposed to be in Hangzhou, China on the 18–24 May. But due to the COVID-19 pandemic, the tournament was postponed and China had to withdraw as hosts.

On 1 April 2022, the Bosnian capital, Sarajevo, was awarded the hosting rights in the new dates of 4–11 November.

== Qualified teams ==
The teams who were invited to participate are as follows:

Africa (1)

- Egypt (withdrew)
- Rwanda (7)

Americas (3)

- Brazil (4)
- Canada (6)
- United States (1)

Asia (1)

- China (withdrew)
- Iran (14)
- Japan (withdrew)

Europe (8)

- Bosnia and Herzegovina (H) (unranked)
- Finland (11)
- Germany (12)
- Hungary (16)
- Italy (5)
- Netherlands (withdrew)
- Poland (23)
- Slovenia (10)
- Ukraine (8)

After the revealing of the teams, China, Egypt, Japan and Netherlands all withdrew, but Poland was brought in. Despite Poland's inclusion, the number of teams went down to 13.

== Seeding ==
Due to the Reduction of teams, there were only three groups. One with five teams and two with four. The numbers indicate their seeding.

Pool A	Pool B	Pool C
Bosnia and Herzegovina (1); Rwanda (6); Ukraine (7); Hungary (12); Poland (13)	United States (2); Canada (5); Slovenia (8); Iran (11)	Brazil (3); Italy (4); Finland (9); Germany (10)

== Venue ==
The venue was the Arena Hotel Hills in Sarajevo.

2022 Sitting Volleyball World Championships – Women's event is located in Bosnia and Herzegovina	Sarajevo
2022 Sitting Volleyball World Championships – Women's event is located in Bosnia and Herzegovina	Arena Hotel Hills
2022 Sitting Volleyball World Championships – Women's event is located in Bosnia and Herzegovina	Capacity: unknown

== Broadcasting rights ==
Radio and Television of Bosnia and Herzegovina (BHRT) is the host broadcaster for the 2022 WPV Sitting Volleyball World Championships. Every game not broadcast is on YouTube.

== Format ==
13 teams are split into three groups, one with five teams and 2 with four. Every team advances to the Knockout Stage. The three group winners advance straight to the Quarter Finals, while the other ten go into the Eighth Finals. The five winners in the Eighth Finals advance to the Quarter Finals, while the five losers play in a 9–13 classification group.

== Group Stage ==
=== Pool A ===
Pos	Team	Pld	W	L	Pts	SW	SL	SR	SPW	SPL	SPR	Qualification
1	Rwanda	4	4	0	11	12	4	3.000	361	286	1.262	Quarter-Finals
2	Ukraine	4	3	1	10	11	3	3.667	308	174	1.770	Eighth Finals
3	Poland	4	2	2	6	7	6	1.167	269	269	1.000	Eighth Finals
4	Hungary	4	1	3	3	4	9	0.444	227	289	0.785	Eighth Finals
5	Bosnia and Herzegovina (H)	4	0	4	0	0	12	0.000	131	300	0.437	Eighth Finals

(H) Host

Date	Time		Score		Set 1	Set 2	Set 3	Set 4	Set 5	Total	Report
4 Nov	18:45	Rwanda	3–1	Poland	26–24	23–25	25–15	25–17		99–81	
5 Nov	11:30	Ukraine	3–0	Hungary	25–6	25–11	25–6			75–23	
5 Nov	15:30	Bosnia and Herzegovina	0–3	Rwanda	10–25	9–25	5–25			24–75	
6 Nov	11:30	Poland	0–3	Ukraine	8–25	18–25	12–25			38–75	
6 Nov	16:30	Hungary	0–3	Poland	21–25	18–25	12–25			51–75	
6 Nov	16:45	Ukraine	3–0	Bosnia and Herzegovina	25–2	25–9	25–11			75–22	
7 Nov	09:00	Rwanda	3–2	Ukraine	10–25	25–23	25–21	16–25	15–9	91–103	
7 Nov	09:15	Bosnia and Herzegovina	0–3	Hungary	11–25	12–25	20–25			43–75	
7 Nov	18:45	Hungary	1–3	Rwanda	14–25	18–25	25–21	21–25		78–96	
7 Nov	19:00	Poland	3–0	Bosnia and Herzegovina	25–19	25–11	25–14			75–44	

=== Pool B ===
Pos	Team	Pld	W	L	Pts	SW	SL	SR	SPW	SPL	SPR	Qualification
1	United States	3	3	0	8	9	3	3.000	278	201	1.383	Quarter-Finals
2	Canada	3	2	1	7	8	5	1.600	283	256	1.105	Eighth Finals
3	Slovenia	3	1	2	3	4	7	0.571	227	256	0.887	Eighth Finals
4	Iran	3	0	3	0	3	9	0.333	215	290	0.741	Eighth Finals

Date	Time		Score		Set 1	Set 2	Set 3	Set 4	Set 5	Total	Report
4 Nov	19:00	United States	3–1	Iran	25–13	25–12	20–25	25–16		95–66	
5 Nov	09:15	Canada	3–1	Slovenia	25–18	25–21	19–25	25–22		94–86	
5 Nov	19:00	Iran	1–3	Slovenia	21–25	25–27	25–20	16–25		87–97	
6 Nov	09:00	United States	3–2	Canada	22–25	25–22	21–25	25–12	15–7	108–91	
6 Nov	19:30	Canada	3–1	Iran	25–10	25–14	23–25	25–13		98–62	
7 Nov	11:30	Slovenia	0–3	United States	12–25	15–25	17–25			44–75	

=== Pool C ===
Pos	Team	Pld	W	L	Pts	SW	SL	SR	SPW	SPL	SPR	Qualification
1	Brazil	3	3	0	9	9	1	9.000	248	164	1.512	Quarter-Finals
2	Italy	3	2	1	6	7	4	1.750	242	206	1.175	Eighth Finals
3	Finland	3	1	2	3	3	7	0.429	171	224	0.763	Eighth Finals
4	Germany	3	0	3	0	2	9	0.222	198	265	0.747	Eighth Finals

Date	Time		Score		Set 1	Set 2	Set 3	Set 4	Set 5	Total	Report
5 Nov	09:00	Brazil	3–0	Germany	25–17	25–17	25–16			75–50	
5 Nov	11:45	Italy	3–0	Finland	25–12	25–12	25–10			75–34	
5 Nov	19:30	Germany	1–3	Finland	25–23	17–25	15–25	17–25		74–98	
6 Nov	09:15	Brazil	3–1	Italy	25–17	23–25	25–12	25–21		98–75	
6 Nov	19:45	Italy	3–1	Germany	25–18	17–25	25–12	25–19		92–74	
7 Nov	11:45	Finland	0–3	Brazil	13–25	11–25	15–25			39–75	

== Knockout Stage ==
=== Bracket ===
Eighth Finals
8 November
Slovenia	3
Finland	0
8 November
Canada	3
Hungary	0
8 November
Italy	3
Bosnia and Herzegovina	0
8 November
Poland	0
Germany	3
8 November
Ukraine	3
Iran	1

Quarterfinals
9 November
Rwanda	0
Slovenia	3
9 November
Canada	3
Italy	1
9 November
United States	3
Germany	0
9 November
Brazil	3
Ukraine	0

Bronze Medal match
10 November
Slovenia	0
Canada	3
10 November
United States	0
Brazil	3

Gold Medal match
11 November
Canada	2
Brazil	3
3rd place match
11 November
Slovenia	0
United States	3

=== Eighth Finals ===
Date	Time		Score		Set 1	Set 2	Set 3	Set 4	Set 5	Total	Report
8 Nov	09:00	Italy	3–0	Bosnia and Herzegovina	25–5	25–6	25–8			75–19	
8 Nov	09:15	Canada	3–0	Hungary	25–8	25–11	25–12			75–31	
8 Nov	11:30	Slovenia	3–0	Finland	25–17	25–14	25–15			75–46	
8 Nov	11:45	Poland	0–3	Germany	12–25	24–26	20–25			56–76	
8 Nov	15:30	Ukraine	3–1	Iran	26–24	21–25	25–23	25–20		97–92	

=== Quarter Finals ===
Date	Time		Score		Set 1	Set 2	Set 3	Set 4	Set 5	Total	Report
9 Nov	09:00	Rwanda	0–3	Slovenia	20–25	8–25	24–26			52–76	
9 Nov	11:30	Brazil	3–0	Ukraine	25–9	25–22	25–17			75–48	
9 Nov	11:45	United States	3–0	Germany	25–10	25–14	25–9			75–33	
9 Nov	15:30	Italy	1–3	Canada	26–24	22–25	17–25	14–25		79–99	

=== Semi Finals ===
Date	Time		Score		Set 1	Set 2	Set 3	Set 4	Set 5	Total	Report
10 Nov	15:30	Slovenia	0–3	Canada	14–25	16–25	21–25			51–75	
10 Nov	15:45	United States	0–3	Brazil	23–25	18–25	17–25			58–75	

=== Bronze Medal match ===
Date	Time		Score		Set 1	Set 2	Set 3	Set 4	Set 5	Total	Report
11 Nov	11:30	Slovenia	0–3	United States	8–25	14–20	10–25			32–70	

=== Gold Medal match ===
Date	Time		Score		Set 1	Set 2	Set 3	Set 4	Set 5	Total	Report
11 Nov	16:30	Canada	2–3	Brazil	23–25	25–18	25–21	17–25	6–15	96–104	

=== Classification rounds ===
5–8th place bracket

5–8th place semifinals
10 November
Rwanda	0
Italy	3
10 November
Ukraine	1
Germany	3

Fifth place
11 November
Italy	3
Germany	0
Seventh place
11 November
Rwanda	0
Ukraine	3

=== 5–8 Semi Finals ===
Date	Time		Score		Set 1	Set 2	Set 3	Set 4	Set 5	Total	Report
10 Nov	11:30	Rwanda	0–3	Italy	17–25	8–25	8–25			33–75	
10 Nov	11:45	Ukraine	1–3	Germany	20–25	25–18	22–25	29–31		96–99	

=== 7th place match ===
Date	Time		Score		Set 1	Set 2	Set 3	Set 4	Set 5	Total	Report
11 Nov	09:00	Rwanda	0–3	Ukraine	18–25	18–25	27–29			63–79	

=== 5th place match ===
Date	Time		Score		Set 1	Set 2	Set 3	Set 4	Set 5	Total	Report
11 Nov	09:15	Italy	3–0	Germany	25–14	25–19	25–13			75–46	

=== 9–13th placement group ===
The five losers in the Eighth Finals all play each other in a five team group to decide the places 9–13.

Pos	Team	Pld	W	L	Pts	SW	SL	SR	SPW	SPL	SPR	Qualification
9	Iran	4	4	0	12	12	0	MAX	301	178	1.691	Ninth place
10	Finland	4	3	1	9	9	4	2.250	293	269	1.089	Tenth place
11	Hungary	4	2	2	6	6	7	0.857	282	280	1.007	Eleventh place
12	Poland	4	1	3	3	5	9	0.556	295	307	0.961	Twelfth place
13	Bosnia and Herzegovina	4	0	4	0	0	12	0.000	163	300	0.543	Thirteenth place

Date	Time		Score		Set 1	Set 2	Set 3	Set 4	Set 5	Total	Report
8 Nov	18:45	Hungary	0–3	Finland	25–27	19–25	21–25			65–77	
9 Nov	09:15	Iran	3–0	Poland	25–10	25–15	25–21			75–46	
9 Nov	18:45	Finland	0–3	Iran	16–25	21–25	19–25			56–75	
9 Nov	19:00	Bosnia and Herzegovina	0–3	Hungary	13–25	11–25	10–25			34–75	
10 Nov	09:00	Iran	3–0	Bosnia and Herzegovina	25–12	25–9	25–13			75–34	
10 Nov	09:15	Poland	1–3	Finland	20–25	13–25	25–10	23–25		81–85	
10 Nov	18:45	Bosnia and Herzegovina	0–3	Poland	9–25	15–25	23–25			47–75	
10 Nov	19:00	Hungary	0–3	Iran	7–25	24–26	11–25			42–76	
11 Nov	09:00	Poland	1–3	Hungary	29–31	25–19	19–25	20–25		93–100	
11 Nov	09:15	Finland	3–0	Bosnia and Herzegovina	25–17	25–16	25–15			75–48	

== Final standing ==
Rank	Team
1st place, gold medalist(s)	Brazil
2nd place, silver medalist(s)	Canada
3rd place, bronze medalist(s)	United States
4	Slovenia
5	Italy
6	Germany
7	Ukraine
8	Rwanda
9	Iran
10	Finland
11	Hungary
12	Poland
13	Bosnia and Herzegovina

Qualified for the 2024 Summer Paralympics

== See also ==
- 2022 Sitting Volleyball World Championships – Men's event
- 2023 Sitting Volleyball European Championships – Men's event
- 2023 Sitting Volleyball European Championships – Women's event
- 2023 Asia and Oceania Sitting Volleyball Championships
- 2023 Pan American Sitting Volleyball Championships
- 2024 African Sitting Volleyball Championships – Men's tournament
- 2024 African Sitting Volleyball Championships – Women's tournament
- 2023 Sitting Volleyball World Cup – Men's event
- 2023 Sitting Volleyball World Cup – Women's event
- 2024 Paralympic Final Qualification Tournament – Men's tournament
- 2024 Paralympic Final Qualification Tournament – Women's tournament
- 2024 World ParaVolley Women's Super 6
- Sitting volleyball at the 2024 Summer Paralympics
