= 2023 Sitting Volleyball European Championships – Men's event =

Volleyball competition held in Italy

Tournament details
- Host country: Italy
- City: Caorle
- Dates: 9–15 October
- Teams: 12
- Venue: 1 (in 1 host city)

Final positions
- Champions: Bosnia and Herzegovina (11th title)
- Runners-up: Germany
- Third place: Ukraine
- Fourth place: Poland

Tournament statistics
- Matches played: 46

The 2023 Sitting Volleyball European Championships – Men's event was the 21st edition of this tournament. For the first time, the competition was held in Caorle, Italy. The winners qualify for the 2024 Summer Paralympics. The defending champions are Bosnia and Herzegovina. They successfully defended their title after defeating Germany, 3–2, in the final.

== Host selection ==
Caorle, Italy was given the hosting rights on the 8 February 2023. This marks the first time the tournament will be held in Italy.

== Qualified teams ==
Nine countries automatically qualified, while three secured their places via the 2022 qualifier in Rouen, France.

Host (1)

- Italy

Automatic Qualifiers (7)

- Bosnia and Herzegovina
- Croatia
- Germany
- Poland
- Serbia
- Turkey
- Ukraine

2022 qualifier teams (3)

- Hungary
- Slovenia
- Latvia

Replacement (1)

- Lithuania

== Venue ==
The venue was the Palamare Valter Vicentini in Caorle.

| 2023 Sitting Volleyball European Championships – Men's event is located in Italy | Caorle |
|---|---|
| 2023 Sitting Volleyball European Championships – Men's event is located in Italy | Palamare Valter Vicentini |
| 2023 Sitting Volleyball European Championships – Men's event is located in Italy | Capacity: unknown |

== Broadcasting rights ==
Every game will be broadcast on ParaVolley Europe YouTube channel.

== Squads ==
Teams can select 12 players for the tournament.

== Draw ==
The draw took place on 13 May 2023 in Caorle.

== Format ==
12 teams are split into two group of six. The top four in each group plays in the Quarterfinals, while the bottom 2 in each group plays in the classification rounds.

== Group stage ==
=== Pool A ===
- All times are local.

| Pos | Team | Pld | W | L | Pts | SW | SL | SR | SPW | SPL | SPR | Qualification |
|---|---|---|---|---|---|---|---|---|---|---|---|---|
| 1 | Bosnia and Herzegovina | 5 | 5 | 0 | 15 | 15 | 0 | MAX | 300 | 181 | 1.657 | Quarterfinals |
| 2 | Poland | 5 | 4 | 1 | 11 | 12 | 7 | 1.714 | 313 | 271 | 1.155 | Quarterfinals |
| 3 | Croatia | 5 | 3 | 2 | 10 | 11 | 6 | 1.833 | 284 | 203 | 1.399 | Quarterfinals |
| 4 | Italy (H) | 5 | 2 | 3 | 4 | 6 | 13 | 0.462 | 309 | 350 | 0.883 | Quarterfinals |
| 5 | Lithuania | 5 | 1 | 4 | 4 | 6 | 13 | 0.462 | 256 | 345 | 0.742 | |
| 6 | Slovenia | 5 | 0 | 5 | 1 | 4 | 15 | 0.267 | 248 | 360 | 0.689 | |

Source: Report
(H) Host

| Date | Time | | Score | | Set 1 | Set 2 | Set 3 | Set 4 | Set 5 | Total | Report |
|---|---|---|---|---|---|---|---|---|---|---|---|
| 9 Oct | 09:15 | Bosnia and Herzegovina | 3–0 | Lithuania | 25–11 | 25–8 | 25–18 | | | 75–37 | |
| 9 Oct | 11:30 | Croatia | 3–0 | Slovenia | 25–11 | 25–21 | 25–12 | | | 75–44 | |
| 9 Oct | 15:45 | Bosnia and Herzegovina | 3–0 | Poland | 25–20 | 25–19 | 25–10 | | | 75–49 | |
| 9 Oct | 17:45 | Italy | 3–2 | Lithuania | 25–19 | 19–25 | 19–25 | 25–22 | 16–14 | 104–105 | |
| 10 Oct | 09:15 | Croatia | 3–0 | Lithuania | 25–9 | 25–13 | 25–16 | | | 75–38 | |
| 10 Oct | 11:30 | Poland | 3–1 | Slovenia | 23–25 | 25–14 | 25–22 | 25–12 | | 98–73 | |
| 10 Oct | 15:45 | Italy | 0–3 | Croatia | 15–25 | 16–25 | 15–25 | | | 46–75 | |
| 10 Oct | 17:45 | Bosnia and Herzegovina | 3–0 | Slovenia | 25–13 | 25–10 | 25–13 | | | 75–36 | |
| 11 Oct | 09:15 | Italy | 0–3 | Poland | 18–25 | 15–25 | 14–25 | | | 47–75 | |
| 11 Oct | 11:30 | Bosnia and Herzegovina | 3–0 | Croatia | 25–17 | 25–19 | 25–23 | | | 75–59 | |
| 11 Oct | 15:45 | Poland | 3–1 | Lithuania | 25–18 | 16–25 | 25–14 | 25–19 | | 91–76 | |
| 11 Oct | 17:45 | Italy | 3–2 | Slovenia | 25–11 | 25–20 | 24–26 | 23–25 | 15–13 | 112–95 | |
| 12 Oct | 11:30 | Slovenia | 1–3 | Lithuania | 21–25 | 25–14 | 14–25 | 16–25 | | 76–89 | |
| 12 Oct | 15:45 | Croatia | 2–3 | Poland | 25–20 | 24–26 | 18–25 | 25–19 | 12–15 | 104–105 | |
| 12 Oct | 17:45 | Italy | 0–3 | Bosnia and Herzegovina | 11–25 | 12–25 | 12–25 | | | 35–75 | |

=== Pool B ===
| Pos | Team | Pld | W | L | Pts | SW | SL | SR | SPW | SPL | SPR | Qualification |
|---|---|---|---|---|---|---|---|---|---|---|---|---|
| 1 | Germany | 5 | 5 | 0 | 14 | 15 | 2 | 7.500 | 417 | 279 | 1.495 | Quarterfinals |
| 2 | Ukraine | 5 | 4 | 1 | 13 | 14 | 3 | 4.667 | 415 | 312 | 1.330 | Quarterfinals |
| 3 | Latvia | 5 | 3 | 2 | 7 | 9 | 10 | 0.900 | 378 | 411 | 0.920 | Quarterfinals |
| 4 | Serbia | 5 | 2 | 3 | 7 | 8 | 9 | 0.889 | 345 | 386 | 0.894 | Quarterfinals |
| 5 | Hungary | 5 | 1 | 4 | 3 | 5 | 14 | 0.357 | 349 | 435 | 0.802 | |
| 6 | Turkey | 5 | 0 | 5 | 1 | 2 | 15 | 0.133 | 252 | 238 | 1.059 | |

Source: Report

| Date | Time | | Score | | Set 1 | Set 2 | Set 3 | Set 4 | Set 5 | Total | Report |
|---|---|---|---|---|---|---|---|---|---|---|---|
| 9 Oct | 09:00 | Germany | 3–0 | Latvia | 25–15 | 25–19 | 25–16 | | | 75–50 | |
| 9 Oct | 11:45 | Ukraine | 3–0 | Hungary | 25–16 | 25–12 | 25–20 | | | 75–48 | |
| 9 Oct | 15:30 | Germany | 3–0 | Turkey | 25–11 | 25–12 | 25–7 | | | 75–30 | |
| 9 Oct | 18:15 | Serbia | 2–3 | Latvia | 25–14 | 22–25 | 25–23 | 11–25 | 11–15 | 94–102 | |
| 10 Oct | 09:00 | Ukraine | 3–0 | Latvia | 25–12 | 25–15 | 25–16 | | | 75–43 | |
| 10 Oct | 11:45 | Turkey | 2–3 | Hungary | 20–25 | 25–21 | 23–25 | 25–22 | 9–15 | 102–108 | |
| 10 Oct | 15:30 | Serbia | 0–3 | Ukraine | 17–25 | 15–25 | 16–25 | | | 48–75 | |
| 10 Oct | 18:15 | Germany | 3–0 | Hungary | 25–10 | 25–10 | 25–16 | | | 75–36 | |
| 11 Oct | 09:00 | Serbia | 3–0 | Turkey | 25–19 | 25–17 | 30–28 | | | 80–64 | |
| 11 Oct | 11:45 | Germany | 3–2 | Ukraine | 21–25 | 26–24 | 25–21 | 26–28 | 19–17 | 117–115 | |
| 11 Oct | 15:30 | Turkey | 0–3 | Latvia | 22–25 | 18–25 | 20–25 | | | 60–75 | |
| 11 Oct | 18:15 | Serbia | 3–0 | Hungary | 25–19 | 25–15 | 25–16 | | | 75–50 | |
| 12 Oct | 09:00 | Hungary | 2–3 | Latvia | 23–25 | 25–23 | 18–25 | 25–17 | 16–18 | 107–108 | |
| 12 Oct | 15:30 | Ukraine | 3–0 | Turkey | 25–23 | 25–19 | 25–14 | | | 75–56 | |
| 12 Oct | 16:00 | Serbia | 0–3 | Germany | 16–25 | 10–25 | 22–25 | | | 48–75 | |

== Knockout stage ==
Quarter-finals
13 October –
Bosnia and Herzegovina | 3
Serbia | 0
13 October –
Ukraine | 3
Croatia | 2
13 October –
Germany | 3
Italy | 0
13 October –
Poland | 3
Latvia | 0

Semi-finals
14 October –
Bosnia and Herzegovina | 3
Ukraine | 0
14 October –
Germany | 3
Poland | 0

Final
15 October –
Bosnia and Herzegovina | 3
Germany | 2
Third place
15 October –
Ukraine | 3
Poland | 0

=== 5–8 classification bracket ===
Semifinals
14 October
Serbia | 1
Croatia | 3
14 October
Italy | 0
Latvia | 3

5th place match
15 October
Croatia | 3
Latvia | 0
7th place match
15 October
Serbia | 3
Italy | 0

=== Quarterfinals ===
| Date | Time | | Score | | Set 1 | Set 2 | Set 3 | Set 4 | Set 5 | Total | Report |
|---|---|---|---|---|---|---|---|---|---|---|---|
| 13 Oct | 11:45 | Bosnia and Herzegovina | 3–0 | Serbia | 25–16 | 25–12 | 25–18 | | | 75–46 | |
| 13 Oct | 12:00 | Poland | 3–0 | Latvia | 25–19 | 25–23 | 25–19 | | | 75–61 | |
| 13 Oct | 15:30 | Ukraine | 3–2 | Croatia | 23–25 | 25–16 | 25–27 | 25–19 | 15–7 | 113–94 | |
| 13 Oct | 15:45 | Germany | 3–0 | Italy | 25–13 | 25–13 | 25–17 | | | 75–43 | |

=== Semifinals ===
| Date | Time | | Score | | Set 1 | Set 2 | Set 3 | Set 4 | Set 5 | Total | Report |
|---|---|---|---|---|---|---|---|---|---|---|---|
| 14 Oct | 18:00 | Bosnia and Herzegovina | 3–0 | Ukraine | 25–14 | 25–16 | 25–19 | | | 75–49 | |
| 14 Oct | 18:15 | Germany | 3–0 | Poland | 25–12 | 25–14 | 25–17 | | | 75–43 | |

=== Third place match ===
| Date | Time | | Score | | Set 1 | Set 2 | Set 3 | Set 4 | Set 5 | Total | Report |
|---|---|---|---|---|---|---|---|---|---|---|---|
| 15 Oct | 10:00 | Ukraine | 3–0 | Poland | 25–17 | 25–12 | 25–16 | | | 75–45 | |

=== Final ===
| Date | Time | | Score | | Set 1 | Set 2 | Set 3 | Set 4 | Set 5 | Total | Report |
|---|---|---|---|---|---|---|---|---|---|---|---|
| 15 Oct | 17:30 | Bosnia and Herzegovina | 3–2 | Germany | 18–25 | 25–23 | 28–30 | 25–21 | 15–6 | 111–105 | |

=== 5–8 Semifinals ===
| Date | Time | | Score | | Set 1 | Set 2 | Set 3 | Set 4 | Set 5 | Total | Report |
|---|---|---|---|---|---|---|---|---|---|---|---|
| 14 Oct | 11:30 | Serbia | 1–3 | Croatia | 23–25 | 21–25 | 25–19 | 13–25 | | 82–94 | |
| 14 Oct | 11:45 | Italy | 0–3 | Latvia | 16–25 | 23–25 | 23–25 | | | 62–75 | |

=== Seventh place match ===
| Date | Time | | Score | | Set 1 | Set 2 | Set 3 | Set 4 | Set 5 | Total | Report |
|---|---|---|---|---|---|---|---|---|---|---|---|
| 14 Oct | 18:30 | Serbia | 3–0 | Italy | 25–23 | 25–20 | 25–20 | | | 75–63 | |

=== Fifth place match ===
| Date | Time | | Score | | Set 1 | Set 2 | Set 3 | Set 4 | Set 5 | Total | Report |
|---|---|---|---|---|---|---|---|---|---|---|---|
| 15 Oct | 09:15 | Croatia | 3–0 | Latvia | 25–21 | 29–27 | 25–16 | | | 79–64 | |

=== 9–12th placement group ===
The four losers that failed to make the quarter finals all play each other in a four team group to decide the places 9–12. Games against the teams that have already played each other are carried over.

| Pos | Team | Pld | W | L | Pts | SW | SL | SR | SPW | SPL | SPR | Qualification |
|---|---|---|---|---|---|---|---|---|---|---|---|---|
| 1 | Hungary | 3 | 3 | 0 | 8 | 9 | 3 | 3.000 | 275 | 228 | 1.206 | Ninth place |
| 2 | Turkey | 3 | 2 | 1 | 7 | 8 | 3 | 2.667 | 252 | 212 | 1.189 | Tenth place |
| 3 | Lithuania | 3 | 1 | 2 | 3 | 3 | 7 | 0.429 | 209 | 227 | 0.921 | Eleventh place |
| 4 | Slovenia | 3 | 0 | 3 | 0 | 2 | 9 | 0.222 | 141 | 180 | 0.783 | Twelfth place |

Source: Report

=== Matches ===
| Date | Time | | Score | | Set 1 | Set 2 | Set 3 | Set 4 | Set 5 | Total | Report |
|---|---|---|---|---|---|---|---|---|---|---|---|
| 13 Oct | 09:00 | Hungary | 3–1 | Slovenia | 25–14 | 16–25 | 25–13 | 25–13 | | 91–65 | |
| 13 Oct | 11:30 | Lithuania | 0–3 | Turkey | 23–25 | 17–25 | 19–25 | | | 59–75 | |
| 14 Oct | 09:00 | Turkey | 3–0 | Slovenia | 25–15 | 25–14 | 25–16 | | | 75–45 | |
| 14 Oct | 11:30 | Lithuania | 0–3 | Hungary | 15–25 | 24–26 | 22–25 | | | 61–76 | |

== Final rankings ==
| Rank | Team |
|---|---|
| Gold medal | Bosnia and Herzegovina |
| Silver medal | Germany |
| Bronze medal | Ukraine |
| 4 | Poland |
| 5 | Croatia |
| 6 | Latvia |
| 7 | Serbia |
| 8 | Italy |
| 9 | Hungary |
| 10 | Turkey |
| 11 | Lithuania |
| 12 | Slovenia |

| Team Qualified for the 2024 Paralympics |

== Awards ==
The awards were as follows:

MVP

- (Bosnia and Herzegovina) Safet Alibasic

Best Setter

- (Germany) Stefan Haehlein

Best Attacker

- (Bosnia and Herzegovina) Ermin Jusufovic

Best Receiver

- (Poland) Robert Wydera

Best Server

- (Germany) Dominik Albrecht

Best Blocker

- (Ukraine) Denys Bytchenko

Best Libero

- (Bosnia and Herzegovina) Ismet Godinjak

Green Card award

- Bosnia and Herzegovina

== See also ==
- 2023 Sitting Volleyball European Championships – Women's event
- 2022 Sitting Volleyball World Championships – Men's event
- 2022 Sitting Volleyball World Championships – Women's event
- 2023 Asia and Oceania Sitting Volleyball Championships
- 2023 Pan American Sitting Volleyball Championships
- 2024 African Sitting Volleyball Championships – Men's tournament
- 2024 African Sitting Volleyball Championships – Women's tournament
- 2023 Sitting Volleyball World Cup – Men's event
- 2023 Sitting Volleyball World Cup – Women's event
- 2024 Paralympic Final Qualification Tournament – Men's tournament
- 2024 Paralympic Final Qualification Tournament – Women's tournament
- 2024 World ParaVolley Women's Super 6
- Sitting volleyball at the 2024 Summer Paralympics
