= 2024 World ParaVolley Women's Super 6 =

Tournament details
- Host country: France
- City: Nancy
- Dates: 11–16 June
- Teams: 6 (from 3 confederations)
- Venue: 1 (in 1 host city)

Final positions
- Champions: United States (2nd title)
- Runners-up: China
- Third place: Brazil
- Fourth place: Italy

Tournament awards
- MVP: (United States) Heather Erickson

Tournament statistics
- Matches played: 18

The 2024 World ParaVolley Women's Super 6 was held in Nancy, France. United States are the defending champions.

United States successfully defended their title and won the event by beating China 3–1 in the final. Brazil came third with a win over Italy.

== Host selection ==
A call for the hosting rights was first said on 9 May 2023. On 23 March 2024, Nancy was given the hosting rights.

== Teams ==
The five best ranked teams in the world joined hosts France in the event.

- Brazil
- Canada
- China
- France (hosts)
- Italy
- United States

== Venue ==
The venue is the Parc des Sports Vandoeuvre Nations in Nancy. The Sports University of Nancy (UFR Staps) and the Physiotherapy University will provide volunteers throughout the competition.

2024 World ParaVolley Women's Super 6 is located in France	Nancy
2024 World ParaVolley Women's Super 6 is located in France	Parc des Sports Vandoeuvre Nations
2024 World ParaVolley Women's Super 6 is located in France	Capacity: Unknown

== Squads ==
Squads ranged from 9 and 14 players for the tournament.

== Format ==
The six teams all play each other in one group where the top two will advance to the final. Third and fourth play for bronze while fifth and sixth play in the fifth place game.

== Group stage ==
Pos	Team	Pld	W	L	Pts	SW	SL	SR	SPW	SPL	SPR	Qualification
1	United States	5	5	0	15	15	3	5.000	445	306	1.454	Final
2	China	5	4	1	12	13	4	3.250	407	314	1.296	Final
3	Brazil	5	3	2	9	11	6	1.833	392	317	1.237	Third place match
4	Italy	5	2	3	6	7	9	0.778	326	343	0.950	Third place match
5	Canada	5	1	4	3	3	12	0.250	302	329	0.918	Fifth place match
6	France (H)	5	0	5	0	0	15	0.000	112	375	0.299	Fifth place match

Source: Report
(H) Host
- All times are local.

Date	Time		Score		Set 1	Set 2	Set 3	Set 4	Set 5	Total	Report
June 11	14:30	France	0–3	Italy	4–25	8–25	11–25	–	–	23–75	
June 11	18:00	Canada	0–3	China	19–25	13–25	16–25	–	–	48–75	
June 11	20:00	Brazil	1–3	United States	18–25	26–24	21–25	22–25	–	87–99	
June 12	16:00	Italy	1–3	United States	14–25	11–25	25–23	10–25	–	60–98	
June 12	18:00	China	3–1	Brazil	25–14	25–17	22–25	26–24	–	98–80	
June 12	20:00	France	0–3	Canada	9–25	8–25	11–25	–	–	28–75	
June 13	16:00	Canada	0–3	Italy	22–25	24–26	23–25	–	–	69–76	
June 13	18:00	Brazil	3–0	France	25–7	25–3	25–6	–	–	75–16	
June 13	20:00	United States	3–1	China	23–25	25–18	25–19	25–19	–	98–81	
June 14	14:30	Italy	0–3	China	26–28	22–25	21–25	–	–	69–78	
June 14	18:00	France	0–3	United States	11–25	7–25	8–25	–	–	26–75	
June 14	20:00	Canada	0–3	Brazil	18–25	19–25	21–25	–	–	58–75	
June 15	16:00	Brazil	3–0	Italy	25–15	25–12	25–19	–	–	75–46	
June 15	18:00	China	3–0	France	25–7	25–9	25–3	–	–	75–19	
June 15	20:00	United States	3–0	Canada	25–20	25–16	25–16	–	–	75–52	

== Knockout stage ==
Final
June 16
United States	3
China	1

Date	Time		Score		Set 1	Set 2	Set 3	Set 4	Set 5	Total	Report
June 16	15:00	United States	3–1	China	25–20	20–25	25–18	25–19	–	95–82	

Third place
June 16
Brazil	3
Italy	0

Date	Time		Score		Set 1	Set 2	Set 3	Set 4	Set 5	Total	Report
June 16	13:00	Brazil	3–0	Italy	25–13	25–23	25–22	–	–	75–58	

Fifth place
June 16
Canada	3
France	0

Date	Time		Score		Set 1	Set 2	Set 3	Set 4	Set 5	Total	Report
June 16	11:00	Canada	3–0	France	25–6	25–7	25–5	–	–	75–18	

== Final rankings ==
Rank	Team
Gold medal	United States
Silver medal	China
Bronze medal	Brazil
4	Italy
5	Canada
6	France

== Awards ==
The awards were as follows:

MVP

- (United States) Heather Erickson

Best Setter

- (United States) Kaleo Kanahele

Best Attacker

- (China) Tang Xuemei

Best Receiver

- (China) Zhang Lijun

Best Server

- (Brazil) Suellen Dellangelica Lima

Best Blocker

- (United States) Katherine Bridge

Best Libero

- (United States) Bethany Zummo

== Preparations ==
On 10 June, a day before the tournament started, the event was officially opened with a grand ceremony at Nancy's Place Stanislas.

== See also ==
- 2022 Sitting Volleyball World Championships – Men's event
- 2022 Sitting Volleyball World Championships – Women's event
- 2023 Sitting Volleyball European Championships – Men's event
- 2023 Sitting Volleyball European Championships – Women's event
- 2023 Asia and Oceania Sitting Volleyball Championships
- 2023 Pan American Sitting Volleyball Championships
- 2023 Sitting Volleyball World Cup – Men's event
- 2023 Sitting Volleyball World Cup – Women's event
- 2024 African Sitting Volleyball Championships – Women's tournament
- 2024 African Sitting Volleyball Championships – Men's tournament
- 2024 Paralympic Final Qualification Tournament – Men's tournament
- 2024 Paralympic Final Qualification Tournament – Women's tournament
- Sitting volleyball at the 2024 Summer Paralympics
