= Iran men's national sitting volleyball team =

Iran
- Association: Association of sitting volleyball of Islamic Republic of Iran
- Head coach: (Iran) Hadi Rezaei

Uniforms
Home	Away

Summer Paralympics
- Appearances: 9 (First in 1988)
- Best result: (1988, 1992, 1996, 2000, 2008, 2016, 2020, 2024)

World Championship
- Appearances: 12 (First in 1984)
- Best result: (1984, 1986, 1990, 1994, 1998, 2010, 2018, 2022, 2026)

The Iran men's national sitting volleyball team represents the Islamic Republic of Iran in international sitting volleyball competitions and friendly matches. The team is one of the dominant forces on the court worldwide. In foreign media, team Iran is colloquially known as the dream team of sitting volleyball.

The Iranian team dedicated their sitting volleyball 2016 Rio Paralympic gold to the memory of Iranian cyclist Bahman Golbarnezhad, who died during the Paralympic C4/C5 competition.

== Players ==
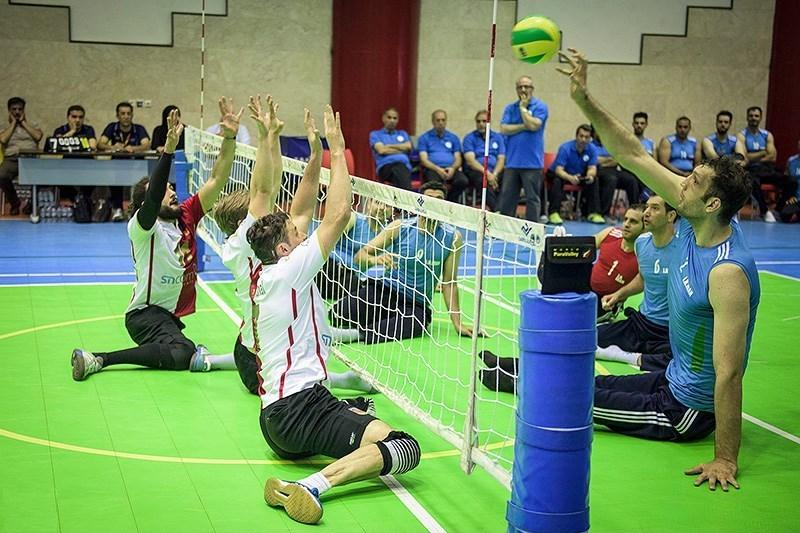
A 8ft 1in Morteza Mehrzad leading Iran to a friendly win over Germany, 2016 Tehran

=== 2024 Summer Paralympics ===
The following is the Iranian roster in the men's volleyball tournament of the 2024 Summer Paralympics.

Head coach: Hadi Rezaei

Assistant coach: Jalil Eimery

N°	Name	Date of birth	Position
9	Hossein Golestani	26 February 1992	MB
1	Hamidreza Abbasifeshki	11 December 2000	L
4	Davoud Alipourian (c)	6 May 1985	O
11	Ramezan Salehihajikolaei	11 March 1979	L
7	Sadegh Bigdeli	26 February 1984	MB
5	Meysam Hajibabaei Movahhed	25 February 1995	S
3	Meisan Ali Pour	13 January 1989	O
10	Isa Zirahi	4 June 1979	MB
8	Majid Lashkarisanami	6 August 1979	S
6	Mohammad Nemati	19 August 1998	9
2	Morteza Mehrzad	17 September 1987	O
12	Mahdi Babadi	25 March 1991	S

Three members of the team made the competition's dream team: Meisam Ali Pour as Most Valuable Player and Best Server, David Alipourian as Best Setter and Morteza Mehrzad as Best Attacker.

=== 2012 Summer Paralympics ===
The following is the Iranian roster in the men's volleyball tournament of the 2012 Summer Paralympics.

Head coach: Hadi Rezaei

№	Name	Date of birth	Position	2012 club
2	Majid Lashgarisanami	6 August 1979	UN	(Iran) Gostareshe Foulad
3	Reza Peidayesh	5 September 1978	WS	(Iran) Dokhaniyat
4	Davood Alipourian	6 May 1985	SE	(Iran) Zob Ahan
5	Ahmad Eiri	21 March 1988	M	(Iran) Gostareshe Foulad
6	Naser Hassanpour Alinazari	30 March 1974	UN	(Iran) Gonbad
7	Sadegh Bigdeli	26 February 1984	WS	(Iran) Gostareshe Foulad
8	Jalil Eimery	21 September 1972	SE	(Iran) Zob Ahan
9	Seyedsaeid Ebrahimibaladezaei	1 July 1979	OS	(Iran) Zob Ahan
10	Isa Zirahi	4 June 1979	OS	(Iran) Zob Ahan
11	Ramezan Salehi Hajikolaei	11 March 1979	L	(Iran) Zob Ahan
12	Mohammad Khaleghi	23 October 1981	SE	(Iran) Gostareshe Foulad

== Honours ==
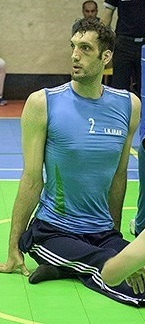
Morteza Mehrzad, tallest ever Paralympian, helped Iran win Gold at Sitting volleyball at the 2016 Summer Paralympics, Sitting volleyball at the 2018 Asian Para Games, 2018 Sitting Volleyball World Champion ship and Sitting volleyball at the 2020 Summer Paralympics

=== Seniors Competitive record ===
==== Paralympic Games ====
Games	Place
(South Korea) 1988 Seoul	Gold
(Spain) 1992 Barcelona	Gold
(United States) 1996 Atlanta	Gold
(Australia) 2000 Sydney	Gold
(Greece) 2004 Athens	Silver
(China) 2008 Beijing	Gold
(United Kingdom) 2012 London	Silver
(Brazil) 2016 Rio	Gold
(Japan) 2020 Tokyo	Gold
(France) 2024 Paris	Gold

==== World Championships ====
Year	Position
1984 Norway	Champions
1986 Hungary	Champions
1990 Netherlands	Champions
1994 Germany	Champions
(Iran) 1998 Tehran	Champions
(Egypt) 2002 Cairo	Third place
(Netherlands) 2006 Roermond	Runners-up
(United States) 2010 Edmond	Champions
(Poland) 2014 Elbląg	Third place
(Netherlands) 2018 The Hague	Champions
(Bosnia and Herzegovina) 2022 Sarajevo	Champions
(China) 2026 Hangzhou	Champions

- 2022 Sitting Volleyball World Championships – Men's event

==== World Cups ====
- 2023 Sitting Volleyball World Cup – Men's event (gold) Gold medal

==== Asia and Oceania Championships ====
- 2023 Asia and Oceania Sitting Volleyball Championships

==== Asian Para Games ====
1. Guangzhou 2010 (gold) Gold medal
2. Incheon 2014 (gold) Gold medal
3. Jakarta 2018 (gold) Gold medal
4. Hangzhou 2022 (gold) Gold medal
5. Nagoya 2026 (gold) Gold medal

==== Minor Tournaments ====
- China 2013 - (gold) Gold Medal (samen alhojaj- Iran)
- China 2011 - (gold) Gold Medal (Zobahan Isfahan- Iran)
- China 2009 - (gold) Gold Medal (Asia Gostaresh Foolad Gostar- Iran)

Sarajevo Open Championship:

- (Bosnia and Herzegovina) Sarajevo Open 2005 - Gold Medal
- 2024 Netherlands Open

=== Juniors Competitive record ===
==== Junior World Championships ====
Year	Position
(Slovenia) 2005 Kamnik	Champions
(Brazil) 2007 Niterói	Champions
(Iran) 2009 Mashhad	Champions

== World Ranking ==
As at 28 September 2016 by World ParaVolley.

At 2016 Rio Paralympics, Iran was seed No. 3. Bosnia was ranked at No. 1 (seed No. 1) as the defending Paralympic champion.

Rank	Movement	Country	Points	Region
1	Steady	Iran	5215	Asia-Oceania
2	Steady	Brazil	4708	Pan America
3	▲1	Egypt	4523	Africa
4	▼1	Bosnia and Herzegovina	4300	Europe
5	Steady	Germany	3578	Europe

== Multiple gold medalists at Paralympics ==
This is a list of multiple gold medalists for Iran in sitting volleyball, listing people who have won three or more gold medals.

Athlete	Sport	Paralympics	Gold	Silver	Bronze	Total
Ali Kashfia	Sitting Volleyball	1988–2000	4	0	0	4
Jalil Imeri	Sitting Volleyball	1996–2012	3	2	0	5
Ali Golkar	Sitting Volleyball	1992–2004	3	1	0	4
Parviz Firouzi	Sitting Volleyball	1992–2000	3	0	0	3
Hadi Rezaei	Sitting Volleyball	1988–1996	3	0	0	3
Ali Akbar Salavatian	Sitting Volleyball	1992–2000	3	0	0	3
Ahmad Shivani	Sitting Volleyball	1988–1996	3	0	0	3
Majid Soleimani	Sitting Volleyball	1992–2000	3	0	0	3

== See also ==
- Volleyball at the Summer Paralympics
- World Para Volleyball Championship
- World Organization Volleyball for Disabled
- Hadi Rezaei
- Bosnia and Herzegovina national sitting volleyball team
- Egypt men's national sitting volleyball team
- Germany men's national sitting volleyball team
- Croatia men's national para volleyball teams
