= 2023 Pan American Sitting Volleyball Championships =

Tournament details
- Host country: Canada
- City: Edmonton
- Dates: 9–13 May
- Venue: 1 (in 1 host city)

The 2023 Pan American Sitting Volleyball Championships decided who took the Americas spot in the Sitting Volleyball tournament at the 2024 Paralympics, after Sitting Volleyball was taken out of the 2023 Pan American Games events program. The winners of the men's tournament was Brazil's men, while the United States won the women's event.

== Host selection ==
Edmonton, Alberta in Canada was announced as the hosts on the 6 September 2022.

== Teams ==
The teams was announced on 1 May 2023.

=== Men's competition ===
- Argentina
- Brazil
- Canada
- United States

=== Women's competition ===
- Brazil (withdrew)
- Canada
- United States

== Venue ==
The Canadian city of Edmonton hosted the event at the Saville Community Sports Centre.

2023 Pan American Sitting Volleyball Championships is located in Canada	Edmonton
2023 Pan American Sitting Volleyball Championships is located in Canada	Saville Community Sports Centre
2023 Pan American Sitting Volleyball Championships is located in Canada	Capacity: unknown

== Men's event ==
2023 Pan American Sitting Volleyball Championships
Tournament details
- Host country: Canada
- City: Edmonton
- Dates: 9–13 May
- Venue: 1 (in 1 host city)
- Runners-up: United States
- Third place: Canada
- Fourth place: Argentina

Tournament statistics
- Matches played: 10

The four teams play each other in a round robin format, where every team advances to the semi finals. In the semi finals, first plays fourth and second plays third. The two winners play the final, while the losers play for third place.

=== Table ===
The teams and schedule was announced on 1 May 2023.

Pos	Team	Pld	W	L	Pts	SW	SL	SR	SPW	SPL	SPR
1	Brazil	3	3	0	9	9	1	9.000	247	181	1.365
2	United States	3	2	1	6	7	5	1.400	273	257	1.062
3	Canada (H)	3	1	2	3	4	6	0.667	217	212	1.024
4	Argentina	3	0	3	0	1	9	0.111	150	250	0.600

(H) Host

Date	Time		Score		Set 1	Set 2	Set 3	Set 4	Set 5	Total	Report
9 May	14:00	Brazil	3–1	United States	25–20	22–25	25–10	25–23		97–78	
9 May	16:30	Canada	3–0	Argentina	25–11	25–17	25–11			75–39	
10 May	14:00	Brazil	3–0	Argentina	25–15	25–11	25–11			75–37	
10 May	19:00	Canada	1–3	United States	26–28	22–25	25–20	23–25		96–98	
11 May	14:00	United States	3–1	Argentina	25–21	23–25	25–13	25–15		98–74	
11 May	16:30	Canada	0–3	Brazil	11–25	18–25	17–25			46–75	

=== Knockout stage ===
Semifinals
12 May
Brazil	3
Argentina	0
12 May
United States	3
Canada	2

Final
13 May
Brazil	3
United States	0
Third place
13 May
Argentina	0
Canada	3

=== Semi finals ===
Date	Time		Score		Set 1	Set 2	Set 3	Set 4	Set 5	Total	Report
12 May	14:00	Brazil	3–0	Argentina	25–9	25–12	25–8			75–29	
12 May	18:45	United States	3–2	Canada	25–19	22–25	27–25	22–25	15–12	111–106	

=== 3rd place match ===
Date	Time		Score		Set 1	Set 2	Set 3	Set 4	Set 5	Total	Report
13 May	11:00	Argentina	0–3	Canada	25–21	23–25	25–13	23–25	19–17	115–101	

=== Final ===
Date	Time		Score		Set 1	Set 2	Set 3	Set 4	Set 5	Total	Report
13 May	13:30	Brazil	3–0	United States	18–25	13–25	11–25			42–75	

=== Final rankings ===
Rank	Team
Gold medal	Brazil
Silver medal	United States
Bronze medal	Canada
4	Argentina

Team Qualified for the 2024 Summer Paralympics

== Women's event ==
2023 Pan American Sitting Volleyball Championships
Tournament details
- Host country: Canada
- City: Edmonton
- Dates: 9–13 May
- Venue: 1 (in 1 host city)
- Runners-up: Canada

Tournament statistics
- Matches played: 5

After Brazil withdrew, Canada and United States played a best of 5 series to decide the winners of the event and secure the ticket to Paris 2024.

=== Matches ===
The teams and schedule was announced on 1 May 2023.

Team 1	Series	Team 2	Game 1	Game 2	Game 3	Game 4	Game 5
Canada	2–3	United States	2–3	1–3	1–3	3–2	3–2

Date	Time		Score		Set 1	Set 2	Set 3	Set 4	Set 5	Total	Report
9 May	19:00	Canada	2–3	United States	25–21	25–18	16–25	17–25	12–15	95–104	
10 May	16:30	Canada	1–3	United States	25–18	16–25	20–25	11–25		72–93	
11 May	19:00	Canada	1–3	United States	22–25	23–25	25–19	21–25		91–94	
12 May	16:30	Canada	3–2	United States	25–18	18–25	25–22	20–25	15–11	103–101	
13 May	16:00	Canada	3–2	United States	25–19	20–25	25–12	22–25	17–15	109–96	

=== Final rankings ===
Rank	Team
Gold medal	United States
Silver medal	Canada

Team Qualified for the 2024 Summer Paralympics

== See also ==
- 2022 Sitting Volleyball World Championships – Men's event
- 2022 Sitting Volleyball World Championships – Women's event
- 2023 Sitting Volleyball European Championships – Men's event
- 2023 Sitting Volleyball European Championships – Women's event
- 2023 Asia and Oceania Sitting Volleyball Championships
- 2024 African Sitting Volleyball Championships – Men's tournament
- 2024 African Sitting Volleyball Championships – Women's tournament
- 2023 Sitting Volleyball World Cup – Men's event
- 2023 Sitting Volleyball World Cup – Women's event
- 2024 Paralympic Final Qualification Tournament – Men's tournament
- 2024 Paralympic Final Qualification Tournament – Women's tournament
- 2024 World ParaVolley Women's Super 6
- Sitting volleyball at the 2024 Summer Paralympics
