= 2024 Men's Sitting Volleyball Paralympic Final Qualification Tournament =

2024 Paralympic Final Qualification Tournament – Men's tournament

Tournament details
- Host country: China
- City: Dali
- Dates: 3–10 April
- Teams: 8 (from 3 confederations)
- Venue: 1 (in 1 host city)

Final positions
- Champions: Ukraine (th title)
- Runners-up: United States
- Third place: China
- Fourth place: Canada

Tournament statistics
- Matches played: 29

The 2024 Men's Sitting Volleyball Paralympic Final Qualification Tournament was held in Dali, China. The winners qualify for the 2024 Summer Paralympics. Ukraine won the event and qualified for the 2024 Summer Paralympics after triumphing over United States 3–0 in the final.

== Host selection ==
A call for the hosting rights was first said on 14 February 2023 by World ParaVolley, before reiterating the call on 9 May 2023. On 31 May 2023, The Yunnan regional government gave funding for the event to be held in Dali. Dali, China was given the hosting rights on 27 October 2023.

== Teams ==
Eight countries entered this event.

- Canada
- China (hosts)
- Croatia
- Iraq
- Japan
- Poland
- Ukraine
- United States

== Venue ==
The venue is the Dali International Olympic Sports Centre in Dali.

2024 Men's Sitting Volleyball Paralympic Final Qualification Tournament is located in China	Dali
2024 Men's Sitting Volleyball Paralympic Final Qualification Tournament is located in China	Dali International Olympic Sports Centre
2024 Men's Sitting Volleyball Paralympic Final Qualification Tournament is located in China	Capacity: 5,000

== Squads ==
Teams can select 12 players for the tournament.

== Format ==
The eight teams all play each other in one group where the top two will advance to the final.

== Group stage ==
Pos	Team	Pld	W	L	Pts	SW	SL	SR	SPW	SPL	SPR	Qualification
1	Ukraine	7	6	1	18	20	5	4.000	594	474	1.253	Final
2	United States	7	6	1	17	19	6	3.167	595	498	1.195	Final
3	China (H)	7	6	1	16	18	9	2.000	634	505	1.255	
4	Canada	7	3	4	10	14	14	1.000	594	679	0.875	
5	Iraq	7	3	4	10	13	14	0.929	587	588	0.998	
6	Croatia	7	3	4	9	11	15	0.733	551	464	1.188	
7	Japan	7	1	6	3	3	19	0.158	403	540	0.746	
8	Poland	7	0	7	1	5	21	0.238	524	627	0.836	

Source: Report
(H) Host
- All times are local.

Date	Time		Score		Set 1	Set 2	Set 3	Set 4	Set 5	Total	Report
April 3	09:00	Ukraine	3–0	Poland	25–13	26–24	25–14	–	–	76–51	
April 3	11:00	China	3–2	Iraq	25–19	22–25	25–16	20–25	15–9	107–94	
April 3	14:00	United States	3–0	Canada	25–19	25–21	25–19	–	–	75–59	
April 3	16:00	Japan	0–3	Croatia	16–25	18–25	19–25	–	–	53–75	
April 4	09:00	Poland	2–3	Croatia	25–22	23–25	18–25	25–20	11–15	102–107	
April 4	11:00	Canada	3–0	Japan	25–23	25–19	25–10	–	–	75–52	
April 4	14:00	Iraq	1–3	United States	21–25	18–25	29–27	20–25	–	88–102	
April 4	16:00	Ukraine	3–0	China	25–19	25–20	25–18	–	–	75–57	
April 5	09:00	China	3–1	Poland	25–23	24–26	25–18	25–20	–	99–87	
April 5	11:00	United States	3–2	Ukraine	21–25	25–20	20–25	25–19	15–13	106–102	
April 5	14:00	Japan	0–3	Iraq	21–25	8–25	26–28	–	–	55–78	
April 5	16:00	Croatia	2–3	Canada	19–25	25–19	22–25	25–15	13–15	104–99	
April 6	09:00	Poland	0–3	Canada	15–25	24–26	20–25	–	–	59–76	
April 6	11:00	Iraq	1–3	Croatia	13–25	25–15	17–25	25–27	–	80–92	
April 6	14:00	Ukraine	3–0	Japan	25–16	25–18	25–19	–	–	75–53	
April 6	16:00	China	3–1	United States	25–21	22–25	25–21	25–20	–	97–87	
April 7	09:00	United States	3–0	Poland	25–19	25–22	25–17	–	–	75–58	
April 7	11:00	Japan	0–3	China	14–25	15–25	17–25	–	–	46–75	
April 7	14:00	Croatia	0–3	Ukraine	21–25	21–25	24–26	–	–	66–76	
April 7	16:00	Canada	1–3	Iraq	18–25	25–23	11–25	23–25	–	77–98	
April 8	09:00	Poland	1–3	Iraq	16–25	18–25	27–25	19–25	–	80–100	
April 8	11:00	Ukraine	3–2	Canada	25–15	25–17	24–26	26–28	15–6	115–92	
April 8	14:00	China	3–0	Croatia	30–28	25–15	25–15	–	–	80–58	
April 8	16:00	United States	3–0	Japan	25–15	25–19	25–14	–	–	75–48	
April 9	09:00	Japan	3–1	Poland	25–21	21–25	25–18	25–23	–	96–87	
April 9	11:00	Croatia	0–3	United States	18–25	14–25	14–25	–	–	46–75	
April 9	14:00	Canada	2–3	China	27–25	24–26	20–25	25–21	20–22	116–119	
April 9	16:00	Iraq	0–3	Ukraine	16–25	17–25	16–25	–	–	49–75	

== Knockout stage ==
Final
April 10
Ukraine	3
United States	0

Date	Time		Score		Set 1	Set 2	Set 3	Set 4	Set 5	Total	Report
April 10	11:00	Ukraine	3–0	United States	25–17	32–30	25–18	–	–	82–65	

== Final rankings ==
Rank	Team
Gold medal	Ukraine
Silver medal	United States
Bronze medal	China
4	Canada
5	Iraq
6	Croatia
7	Japan
8	Poland

Team Qualified for the 2024 Paralympics

== See also ==
- 2024 Paralympic Final Qualification Tournament – Women's tournament
- 2023 Sitting Volleyball European Championships – Men's event
- 2023 Sitting Volleyball European Championships – Women's event
- 2022 Sitting Volleyball World Championships – Men's event
- 2022 Sitting Volleyball World Championships – Women's event
- 2023 Asia and Oceania Sitting Volleyball Championships
- 2023 Pan American Sitting Volleyball Championships
- 2023 Sitting Volleyball World Cup – Men's event
- 2023 Sitting Volleyball World Cup – Women's event
- 2024 African Sitting Volleyball Championships – Women's tournament
- 2024 African Sitting Volleyball Championships – Men's tournament
- 2024 World ParaVolley Women's Super 6
- Sitting volleyball at the 2024 Summer Paralympics
