= 2024 African Sitting Volleyball Championships – Women's tournament =

Tournament details
- Host country: Nigeria
- City: Lagos
- Dates: 29 January – 3 February
- Teams: 3
- Venue: 1 (in 1 host city)

Final positions
- Champions: Rwanda (4th title)
- Runners-up: Kenya
- Third place: Nigeria

Tournament statistics
- Matches played: 7

The 2024 African Sitting Volleyball Championships – Women's tournament was held in Lagos, Nigeria. The winners qualify for the 2024 Summer Paralympics. Rwanda are the three-time defending champions. Rwanda won the competition and qualified for the Paralympics after a 3–0 over Kenya.

== Host selection ==
Lagos, Nigeria was given the hosting rights.

== Qualified teams ==
Four countries entered for this championship. There were originally three teams, but Kenya entered the competition a week before the event began. Shortly before the tournament started, Zimbabwe withdrew, bringing the number of teams back to three.

- Kenya
- Nigeria (hosts)
- Rwanda
- Zimbabwe (withdrew)

== Venue ==
The venue is the Teslim Balogun Stadium, near the National Stadium in Lagos.

2024 African Sitting Volleyball Championships – Women's tournament is located in Nigeria	Lagos
2024 African Sitting Volleyball Championships – Women's tournament is located in Nigeria	Teslim Balogun Stadium
2024 African Sitting Volleyball Championships – Women's tournament is located in Nigeria	Capacity: unknown

== Squads ==
Teams can select 12 players for the tournament.

== Draw ==
The draw took place on 6 January 2024 in Rabat, Morocco.

== Format ==
The 3 teams all play in one group. Each team plays each other twice, with the top 2 making the final.

== Group stage ==
- All times are local.

Pos	Team	Pld	W	L	Pts	SW	SL	SR	SPW	SPL	SPR	Qualification
1	Rwanda	4	4	0	12	12	0	MAX	300	134	2.239	Final
2	Kenya	4	2	2	6	6	6	1.000	240	215	1.116	Final
3	Nigeria (H)	4	0	4	0	0	12	0.000	109	300	0.363	
4	Zimbabwe	0	0	0	0	0	0	—	0	0	—	Withdrew

Source: Report
(H) Host

Date	Time		Score		Set 1	Set 2	Set 3	Set 4	Set 5	Total	Report
29 Jan	16:00	Nigeria	0–3	Kenya	15–25	6–25	15–25			36–75	
30 Jan	16:00	Rwanda	3–0	Nigeria	25–6	25–4	25–9			75–19	
31 Jan	10:00	Kenya	0–3	Rwanda	12–25	16–25	17–25			45–75	
31 Jan	17:15	Kenya	3–0	Nigeria	25–13	25–9	25–7			75–29	
1 Feb	10:00	Rwanda	3–0	Kenya	25–19	25–12	25–14			75–45	
1 Feb	17:15	Nigeria	0–3	Rwanda	8–25	9–25	8–25			25–75	

== Knockout stage ==
Final
3 February
Rwanda	3
Kenya	0

Date	Time		Score		Set 1	Set 2	Set 3	Set 4	Set 5	Total	Report
3 Feb	16:00	Rwanda	3–0	Kenya	25–12	25–14	25–21			75–47	

== Final rankings ==
Rank	Team
Gold medal	Rwanda
Silver medal	Kenya
Bronze medal	Nigeria

Team Qualified for the 2024 Paralympics

== See also ==
- 2024 African Sitting Volleyball Championships – Men's tournament
- 2023 Sitting Volleyball European Championships – Men's event
- 2023 Sitting Volleyball European Championships – Women's event
- 2022 Sitting Volleyball World Championships – Men's event
- 2022 Sitting Volleyball World Championships – Women's event
- 2023 Asia and Oceania Sitting Volleyball Championships
- 2023 Pan American Sitting Volleyball Championships
- 2023 Sitting Volleyball World Cup – Men's event
- 2023 Sitting Volleyball World Cup – Women's event
- 2024 Paralympic Final Qualification Tournament – Men's tournament
- 2024 Paralympic Final Qualification Tournament – Women's tournament
- 2024 World ParaVolley Women's Super 6
- Sitting volleyball at the 2024 Summer Paralympics
