= 2023 Sitting Volleyball World Cup – Women's event =

Tournament details
- Host country: Egypt
- City: Cairo
- Dates: 12–18 November
- Teams: 10 (from 4 confederations)
- Venue: 1 (in 1 host city)

Final positions
- Champions: China (1st title)
- Runners-up: Canada
- Third place: Brazil
- Fourth place: Germany

Tournament statistics
- Matches played: 33

The 2023 Sitting Volleyball World Cup – Women's event was for the first time held in Cairo, Egypt. The winners or highest ranked team not yet qualified, will advance to the 2024 Summer Paralympics. The reigning champions are United States, but they didn't enter this time around. China won the title, dispatching Canada 3–1 in the final.

== History ==
1. 2008 Intercontinental Cup
2. 2010 World Cup
3. 2012 Intercontinental Cup
4. 2016 Intercontinental Cup
5. 2023 World Cup

== Host selection ==
Originally, Cairo was chosen as the replacement venue for the 2020 edition in Hangzhou, China after the Chinese withdrew because of the COVID-19 pandemic (the competition dates were 24–30 April). However, on 12 March, it was confirmed the event would be postponed until further notice. The tournament was going to commence on 10–15 December 2021. Although, for a second time, the event was postponed. After multiple postponements, Cairo, Egypt was given the hosting rights on the 13 September 2022 for the 2023 edition. This marks Egypt's first time organising the event.

== Teams ==
Host (1)

- Egypt

Participating teams (9)

- Brazil
- Canada
- China
- Germany
- Mongolia
- Netherlands
- Rwanda
- Slovenia
- Ukraine

== Venue ==
The venue was the New Capital Sports Hall in the New Administrative Capital, near Cairo. Despite the tournament being held just outside of Cairo, the event was still called Cairo 2023.

2023 Sitting Volleyball World Cup – Women's event is located in Egypt	New Administrative Capital
2023 Sitting Volleyball World Cup – Women's event is located in Egypt	New Capital Sports Hall
2023 Sitting Volleyball World Cup – Women's event is located in Egypt	Capacity: 7,500

== Broadcasting rights ==
Every game was broadcast on the World ParaVolley YouTube channel.

== Squads ==
Squads ranged from 7 to 14 players for the tournament.

== Format ==
10 teams are split into two group of five. The top four in each group plays in the Quarterfinals, while the bottom team in each group plays in the classification match.

== Group stage ==
=== Group A ===
- All times are local.

Pos	Team	Pld	W	L	Pts	SW	SL	SR	SPW	SPL	SPR	Qualification
1	China	4	4	0	12	12	0	MAX	300	93	3.226	Quarterfinals
2	Germany	4	3	1	9	9	3	3.000	264	215	1.228	Quarterfinals
3	Rwanda	4	2	2	6	6	6	1.000	235	210	1.119	Quarterfinals
4	Egypt (H)	4	1	3	3	3	10	0.300	179	296	0.605	Quarterfinals
5	Mongolia	4	0	4	0	1	12	0.083	156	320	0.488	

Source: Report
(H) Host

Date	Time		Score		Set 1	Set 2	Set 3	Set 4	Set 5	Total	Report
12 Nov	10:30	China	3–0	Mongolia	25–3	25–7	25–4			75–14	
12 Nov	12:00	Rwanda	0–3	Germany	20–25	19–25	22–25			61–75	
12 Nov	17:30	Mongolia	0–3	Rwanda	11–25	7–25	10–25			28–75	
13 Nov	10:00	Egypt	0–3	China	9–25	4–25	3–25			16–75	
13 Nov	15:00	Germany	3–0	Mongolia	25–15	25–15	25–13			75–43	
13 Nov	17:00	Rwanda	3–0	Egypt	25–6	25–16	25–10			75–32	
14 Nov	14:00	Egypt	0–3	Germany	10–25	8–25	18–25			36–75	
14 Nov	15:30	China	3–0	Rwanda	25–7	25–6	25–11			75–24	
15 Nov	10:30	Germany	0–3	China	13–25	8–25	18–25			39–75	
15 Nov	12:00	Mongolia	1–3	Egypt	13–25	18–25	25–20	15–25		71–95	

=== Group B ===
Pos	Team	Pld	W	L	Pts	SW	SL	SR	SPW	SPL	SPR	Qualification
1	Canada	4	4	0	12	12	2	6.000	333	253	1.316	Quarterfinals
2	Brazil	4	3	1	9	10	3	3.333	313	215	1.456	Quarterfinals
3	Slovenia	4	2	2	5	7	8	0.875	295	305	0.967	Quarterfinals
4	Ukraine	4	1	3	4	5	9	0.556	256	304	0.842	Quarterfinals
5	Netherlands	4	0	4	0	0	12	0.000	180	300	0.600	

Source: Report

Date	Time		Score		Set 1	Set 2	Set 3	Set 4	Set 5	Total	Report
12 Nov	14:00	Brazil	3–0	Netherlands	25–15	25–14	25–15			75–44	
12 Nov	15:30	Slovenia	3–2	Ukraine	25–20	19–25	25–16	21–25	15–9	105–95	
13 Nov	11:30	Netherlands	0–3	Slovenia	13–25	16–25	13–25			42–75	
13 Nov	13:30	Canada	3–1	Brazil	15–25	25–21	25–22	25–20		90–88	
14 Nov	10:30	Slovenia	1–3	Canada	21–25	17–25	25–18	14–25		77–93	
14 Nov	12:00	Ukraine	3–0	Netherlands	25–13	25–13	25–23			75–49	
14 Nov	17:30	Canada	3–0	Ukraine	25–13	25–14	25–16			75–43	
14 Nov	19:00	Brazil	3–0	Slovenia	25–16	25–9	25–13			75–38	
15 Nov	14:00	Ukraine	0–3	Brazil	9–25	23–25	11–25			43–75	
15 Nov	15:30	Netherlands	0–3	Canada	20–25	17–25	8–25			45–75	

== Knockout stage ==
Quarter-finals
16 November
China	3
Ukraine	0
16 November
Brazil	3
Rwanda	0
16 November
Canada	3
Egypt	0
16 November
Germany	3
Slovenia	1

Semi-finals
17 November
China	3
Brazil	0
17 November
Canada	3
Germany	0

Final
18 November
China	3
Canada	1
Third place
18 November
Brazil	3
Germany	0

=== 5–8 classification bracket ===
Semifinals
17 November
Ukraine	3
Rwanda	0
17 November
Egypt	0
Slovenia	3

5th place match
18 November
Ukraine	3
Slovenia	0
7th place match
18 November
Rwanda	3
Egypt	0

=== Ninth place match ===
9th place
17 November
Mongolia	0
Netherlands	3

=== Quarterfinals ===
Date	Time		Score		Set 1	Set 2	Set 3	Set 4	Set 5	Total	Report
16 Nov	12:00	China	3–0	Ukraine	25–11	25–15	25–14			75–40	
16 Nov	14:00	Germany	3–1	Slovenia	12–25	27–25	25–19	25–19		89–88	
16 Nov	15:30	Brazil	3–0	Rwanda	25–15	27–25	25–14			77–54	
16 Nov	17:30	Canada	3–0	Egypt	25–11	25–5	25–18			75–34	

=== Semifinals ===
Date	Time		Score		Set 1	Set 2	Set 3	Set 4	Set 5	Total	Report
17 Nov	12:00	China	3–0	Brazil	25–23	25–21	25–23			75–67	
17 Nov	14:00	Canada	3–0	Germany	25–13	25–17	25–23			75–53	

=== Third place match ===
Date	Time		Score		Set 1	Set 2	Set 3	Set 4	Set 5	Total	Report
18 Nov	14:00	Brazil	3–0	Germany	25–13	25–17	25–18			75–48	

=== Final ===
Date	Time		Score		Set 1	Set 2	Set 3	Set 4	Set 5	Total	Report
18 Nov	16:00	China	3–1	Canada	25–23	25–16	17–25	25–20		92–84	

=== Ninth place match ===
Date	Time		Score		Set 1	Set 2	Set 3	Set 4	Set 5	Total	Report
17 Nov	10:30	Mongolia	0–3	Netherlands	20–25	25–27	18–25	–	–	63–77	

=== 5–8 Semifinals ===
Date	Time		Score		Set 1	Set 2	Set 3	Set 4	Set 5	Total	Report
17 Nov	15:30	Rwanda	1–3	Ukraine	25–18	9–25	19–25	23–25		76–93	
17 Nov	17:30	Slovenia	3–0	Egypt	25–16	25–17	25–14			75–47	

=== Seventh place match ===
Date	Time		Score		Set 1	Set 2	Set 3	Set 4	Set 5	Total	Report
18 Nov	10:00	Rwanda	3–0	Egypt	25–16	25–17	25–14			75–47	

=== Fifth place match ===
Date	Time		Score		Set 1	Set 2	Set 3	Set 4	Set 5	Total	Report
18 Nov	12:00	Ukraine	3–0	Slovenia	25–20	25–21	25–21			75–62	

== Final rankings ==
Rank	Team
Gold medal	China
Silver medal	Canada
Bronze medal	Brazil
4	Germany
5	Ukraine
6	Slovenia
7	Rwanda
8	Egypt
9	Netherlands
10	Mongolia

Team Qualified for the 2024 Paralympics

== Awards ==
The awards were as follows:

MVP

- (Canada) Heidi Amanda Peters

Best Setter

- (Canada) Sarah Anne Melenka

Best Attacker

- (China) Xu Yixiao

Best Receiver

- (China) Su Limei

Best Server

- (Canada) Heidi Amanda Peters

Best Blocker

- (Brazil) Janaina Petit Cunha

Best Libero

- (Brazil) Gizele Maria Da Costa Dias

== See also ==
- 2023 Sitting Volleyball World Cup – Men's event
- 2023 Sitting Volleyball European Championships – Men's event
- 2022 Sitting Volleyball World Championships – Men's event
- 2022 Sitting Volleyball World Championships – Women's event
- 2023 Sitting Volleyball European Championships – Men's event
- 2023 Asia and Oceania Sitting Volleyball Championships
- 2023 Pan American Sitting Volleyball Championships
- 2024 African Sitting Volleyball Championships – Men's tournament
- 2024 African Sitting Volleyball Championships – Women's tournament
- 2024 Paralympic Final Qualification Tournament – Men's tournament
- 2024 Paralympic Final Qualification Tournament – Women's tournament
- 2024 World ParaVolley Women's Super 6
- Sitting volleyball at the 2024 Summer Paralympics
