= Germany men's national sitting volleyball team =

Sports team

Germany
- Association: National Paralympic Committee Germany
- Head coach: Michael Merten

Uniforms
Home	Away

Summer Paralympics
- Appearances: 11 (First in 1976)
- Best result: (2) 1976, 1984

World Championship
- Appearances: 11 (First in 1983)
- Best result: (2) 1983, 2002

Sitting Volleyball European Championships
- Appearances: 15 (First in 1981)
- Best result: (6) 1981, 1999, 2001, 2003, 2005, 2015.

The Germany men's national sitting volleyball team represents (Germany) in international sitting volleyball competitions and friendly matches. Until 1990 team competed as West Germany in sitting volleyball.

== Players ==
The following is the German roster in the men's volleyball tournament of the 2016 Summer Paralympics.

Germany

- SCHIFFLER Alexander
- VOGEL Martin
- SCHU Stefan
- HAHNLEIN Stefan Klaus Hans
- ALBRECHT Dominik Marcel
- WIESENTHAL Heiko
- SCHIWY Lukas
- SCHRAPP Jurgen
- HERZOG Christoph
- SAYILIR Barbaros
- TIGLER Mathis
- SCHIEWE Torben

The following is the German roster in the men's volleyball tournament of the 2012 Summer Paralympics.

Head coach: Rudi Sonnenbichler

№	Name	Date of birth	Position	2012 club
1	Alexander Schiffler	20 January 1982	UN	(Germany) BV Leipzig
3	Thomas Renger	19 August 1972	M	(Germany) TSV Bayer Leverkusen
5	Stefan Hähnlein	12 June 1990	SE	(Germany) TSV Bayer Leverkusen
6	Sebastian Czpakowski	12 April 1974	WS	(Germany) TSV Bayer Leverkusen
7	Heiko Wiesenthal	12 February 1975	OS	(Germany) TSV Bayer Leverkusen
8	Peter Schlorf	4 June 1986	M	(Germany) SSC Berlin
9	Jürgen Schrapp	27 July 1974	WS	(Germany) TSV Bayer Leverkusen
10	Christoph Herzog	27 July 1983	WS	(Germany) BV Leipzig
11	Barbaros Sayilir	25 October 1988	UN	(Germany) TSV Bayer Leverkusen
14	Torben Schiewe	11 March 1985	SE	(Germany) BCV Celle

== Honours ==
=== Paralympic Games ===
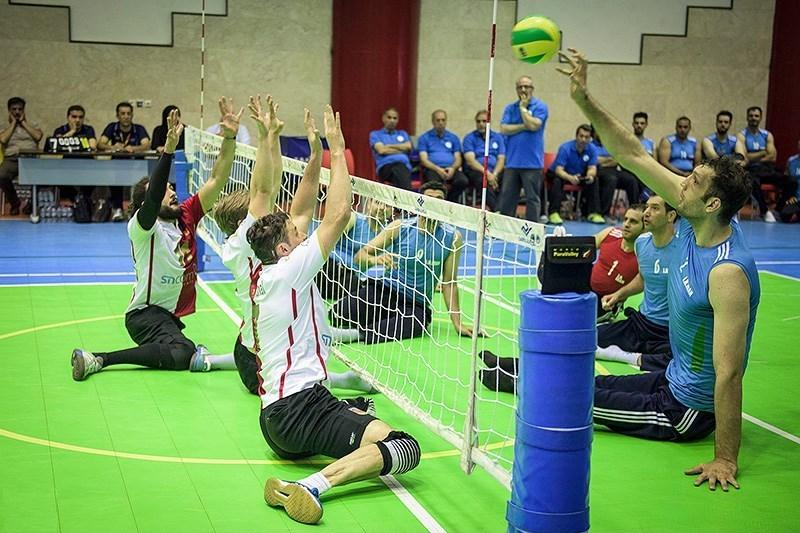
Germany vs Iran during a 2016 friendly game in Tehran

Games	Place
1976 Toronto	Silver
1980 Arnhem	N/A
1984 New York	Silver
1988 Seoul	6th place
1992 Barcelona	Bronze
1996 Atlanta	5th place
2000 Sydney	5th place
2004 Athens	4th place
2008 Beijing	Did not qualify
2012 London	Bronze
2016 Rio	6th place
2020 Paris	4th place

=== World Championships ===
Year	Position
1983 Delden	Runners-up
1985 Kristiansand	7th place
1986 Pécs	6th place
1989 Las Vegas	3rd place
1990 Assen	5th place
1994 Bottrop	6th place
1998 Tehran	5th place
2002 Cairo	Runners-up
2006 Roermond	4th place
2010 Edmond	6th place
2014 Elbląg	Third place

=== European Championships ===
Games	Place
1981 Bonn	Runners-up
1987 Sarajevo	N/A
1991 Nottingham	N/A
1993 Järvenpää	N/A
1995 Ljubljana	N/A
1997 Tallinn	N/A
1999 Sarajevo	Runners-up
2001 Sárospatak	Runners-up
2003 Lappeenranta	Runners-up
2005 Leverkusen	Runners-up
2007 Nyíregyháza	3rd place
2009 Elbląg	3rd place
2011 Rotterdam	3rd place
2013 Elbląg	3rd place
2015 Warendorf	Runners-up
2017 Poreč	5th place

=== Minor tournaments ===
Sarajevo Open Championship:

- Runners-Up (1): 2009
- 3rd place (2): 2007, 2016
- 4th place (3): 2010, 2012, 2014

== Germany-Bosnia rivalry ==
Germany since team formation has been a long time European adversary to Bosnia-Herzegovina during sitting volleyball championships as teams have met at almost every major tournament in later stages of the finals.

Stage	Tournament	Opponents	Result	Details
GS	1995 European Championships	Bosnia	3:0	
Final	1999 European Championships	Bosnia	0:3	
QF	2000 Summer Paralympics	BiH	1:3	
Final	2001 European Championships	BiH	1:3	
GS	2002 World Championships	BiH	0:3	
Final	2002 World Championships	BiH	0:3	
Final	2003 European Championships	BiH	0:3	Set 1: (21:25); Set 2: (18:25); Set 3: (12:25)
SF	2004 Summer Paralympics	BiH	2:3	
Final	2005 European Championships	BiH	0:3	Set 1: (21:25); Set 2: (14:25); Set 3: (21:25)
GS	2006 World Championships	BiH	0:3	Set 1: (20:25); Set 2: (18:25); Set 3: (10:25)
Int.	2007 Friendly (in Berlin, GER)	BiH	1:3	
SF	2007 European Championships	BiH	2:3	Set 1: (25:17); Set 2: (18:25); Set 3: (25:22); Set 4: (17:25); Set 5: (12:15)
SF	2009 European Championships	BiH	0:3	Set 1: (22:25); Set 2: (14:25); Set 3: (14:25)
SF	2012 Summer Paralympics	BiH	0:3	Set 1: (19:25); Set 2: (20:25); Set 3: (14:25)
QF	2014 World Championships	BiH	1:3	Set 1: (21:25); Set 2: (21:25); Set 3: (25:18); Set 4: (23:25)
Final	2015 European Championships	BiH	0:3	Set 1: (22:25); Set 2: (19:25); Set 3: (23:25)
TOTAL Record
–	14 Tournaments	Played: 15	Won: 1; Lost: 14	Won Sets by Germany: 11; Won Sets by Bosnia: 45

== World ranking ==
As at 28 September 2016.

Rank	Movement	Country	Points	Region
1	Steady	Iran	5215	Asia-Oceania
2	Steady	Brazil	4708	Pan America
3	▲1	Egypt	4523	Africa
4	▼1	Bosnia and Herzegovina	4300	Europe
5	Steady	Germany	3578	Europe

== See also ==
- Germany at the Paralympics
- Volleyball at the Summer Paralympics
- World Organization Volleyball for Disabled
