= Egypt men's national sitting volleyball team =

National sports team

Egypt
- Association: National Paralympic Committee Egypt for Volleyball
- Head coach: Rudi Sonnenbichler

Uniforms
Home	Away

Summer Paralympics
- Appearances: 11 (First in 1980)
- Best result: (bronze) (2004, 2016, 2024)

World Championship
- Appearances: 6 (First in 1998)
- Best result: (bronze) (2006, 2010)

The Egypt men's national sitting volleyball team represents Egypt in international sitting volleyball competitions and friendly matches. The team is one of the newcomers in the sport. Egypt have appeared in several Paralympic and World Championships semi finals.

== Players ==
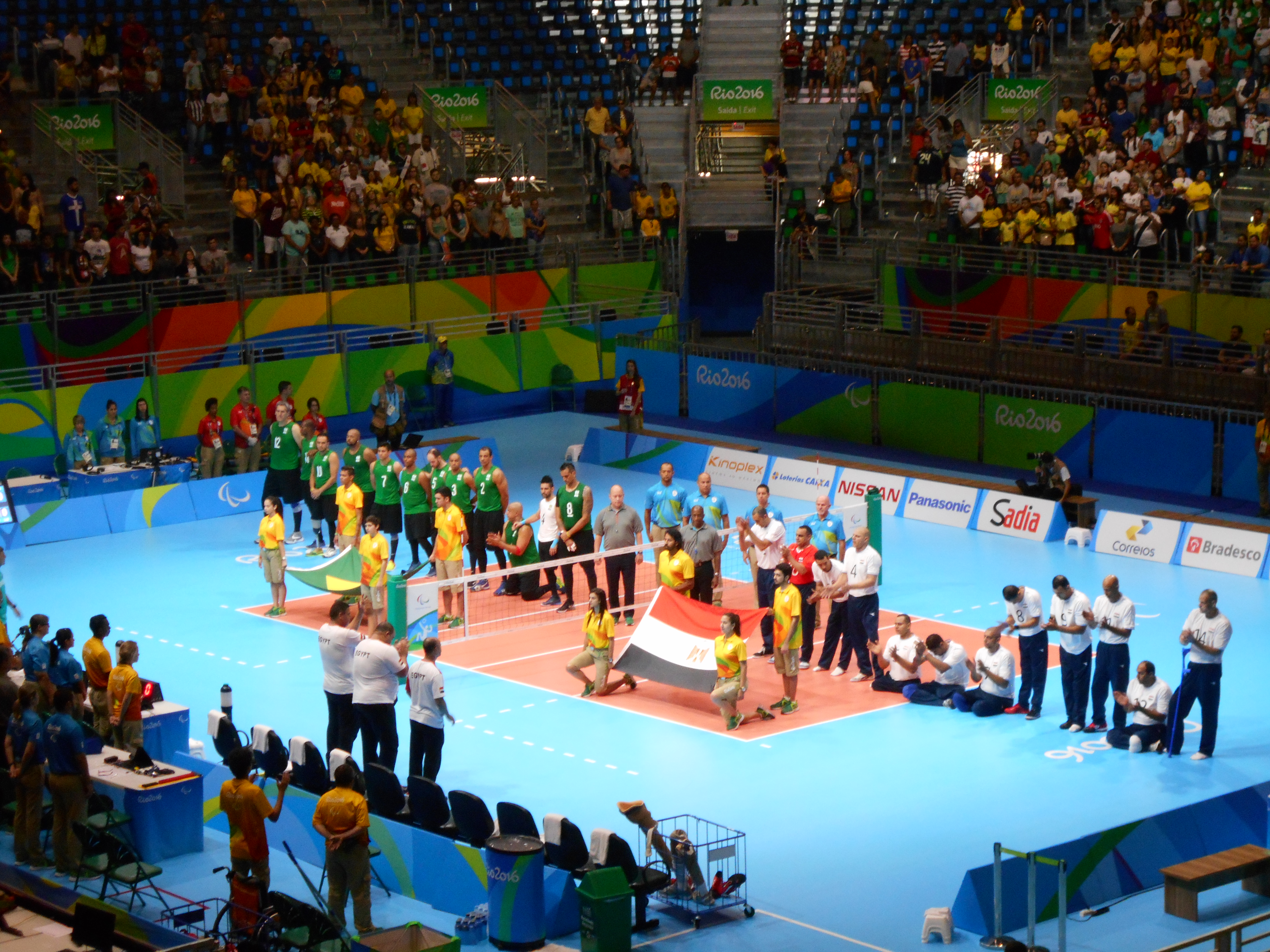
Egypt vs Brazil men's match at the 2016 Summer Paralympics in Rio

The following is the Egypt roster in the men's volleyball tournament of the 2012 Summer Paralympics.

Head coach: Mansour El Mohamdy

№	Name	Date of birth	Position	2012 club
1	Hesham Abdelmaksod	2 February 1975	M	(Egypt) El Houreya
2	Tamer Morgan Khalil	9 March 1971	WS	(Egypt) El Houreya
3	Yasser Saad Abd El Wahab Hassan	14 October 1973	SE	(Egypt) Police Sports Club Association
4	Ashraf Zaghloul Abdel Aziz	24 February 1974	WS	(Egypt) Police Sports Club Association
5	Taher Adel Elbahaey	9 June 1972	SE	(Egypt) El Houreya
6	Ahmed Mohammed Soliman Khamis	12 April 1987	M	(Egypt) Club Alexandria Petroleum
7	Ahmed Mohammed Fadl	1 March 1985	WS	(Egypt) Club Alexandria Petroleum
8	Mohamed Ezzeldin Mohamed	1 September 1992	WS	(Egypt) Club Alexandria Petroleum
9	Elsayed Moussa Saad	28 May 1979	WS	(Egypt) Police Sports Club Association
10	Abdel Nabi Ahmed Abdel Latif	18 June 1972	L	(Egypt) Police Sports Club Association
12	Mohamed Ibrahim	29 March 1979	M	(Egypt) Police Sports Club Association

Egypt roster in 2016:

- 1 (S) ELSHWIKH Hesham (C) - Outside Hitter
- 3 KHATER Shaaban - Outside Hitter
- 4 (S) ABDALLA Ashraf - Opposite Spiker
- 5 ZEID Mohamed - Setter
- 6 (S) SOLIMAN Ahmed - Middle Block
- 7 AMER Ahmed - Outside Hitter
- 8 MASSOUD Hossam - Setter
- 9 (S) MOUSSA Elsayed - Outside Hitter
- 10 (S) ABDELLATIF Abdelnaby - Libero
- 11 EID Sabry - Outside Hitter
- 12 (S) ABOUELYAZEID Mohamed - Middle Block
- 14 (S) ABOUELKHIR Metawa - Outside Hitter

== Results ==
Champions Runners up Third place Fourth place

- Green border color indicates tournament was held on home soil.

=== Paralympic Games ===
Year	Round	Position	Pld	W	L	SW	SL
(Canada) 1976 Toronto	Did not enter						
(Netherlands) 1980 Arnhem	Group stage	6th place	6	2	4	6	12
(United States) 1984 New York	Group stage	8th place	5	1	4	3	13
(Korea) 1988 Seoul	Group stage	9th place	5	1	4	3	12
(Spain) 1992 Barcelona	Group stage	8th place	7	2	5	9	15
(United States) 1996 Atlanta	Did not enter						
(Australia) 2000 Sydney	Semi-final	4th place	8	6	2	19	6
(Greece) 2004 Athens	Semi-final	3rd place	6	3	3	12	9
(China) 2008 Beijing	Semi-final	4th place	5	2	3	8	9
(United Kingdom) 2012 London	Quarter-final	6th place	5	2	3	9	9
(Brazil) 2016 Rio	Semi-final	3rd place	5	4	1	12	9
(Japan) 2020 Tokyo	Group stage	5th place	4	2	2	6	8
(France) 2024 Paris	Semi-final	3rd place	5	3	2	11	9
Total	3 Medals	11/13	61	28	33	98	111

=== World Championships ===
Year	Position
(Iran) 1998 Tehran	7th place
(Egypt) 2002 Cairo	4th place
(Netherlands) 2006 Roermond	3rd place
(United States) 2010 Edmond	3rd place
(Poland) 2014 Elbląg	4th place
(Netherlands) 2018 Arnhem	6th place
(Bosnia and Herzegovina) 2022 Sarajevo	4th place
(China) 2026 Hangzhou	7th place

=== Minor Tournaments ===
(Bosnia and Herzegovina) Sarajevo Open Championship:

- Runners-Up (1): 2006
- 4th place (1): 2016

== World ranking ==
As at 28 September 2016.

Rank	Movement	Country	Points	Region
1	Steady	Iran	5215	Asia-Oceania
2	Steady	Brazil	4708	Pan America
3	▲1	Egypt	4523	Africa
4	▼1	Bosnia and Herzegovina	4300	Europe
5	Steady	Germany	3578	Europe

== Coaching staff ==
Position	Name	Active
Head coach	(Egypt) ELAIUTY Mosaad	
Assistant coach	(Egypt) ELBAHAEY Taher	
Assistant coach	(Egypt) ABBAS Amim	
Therapist/Trainer	(Egypt) AHMED Amr	

== See also ==
- Egypt at the Paralympics
- Volleyball at the Summer Paralympics
- World Organization Volleyball for Disabled
