= Iran women's national sitting volleyball team =

Iran
- Association: Association of sitting volleyball of Islamic Republic of Iran
- Head coach: (Iran) Maryam Iranmanesh

Uniforms
Home	Away
- Appearances: (First in 2016)

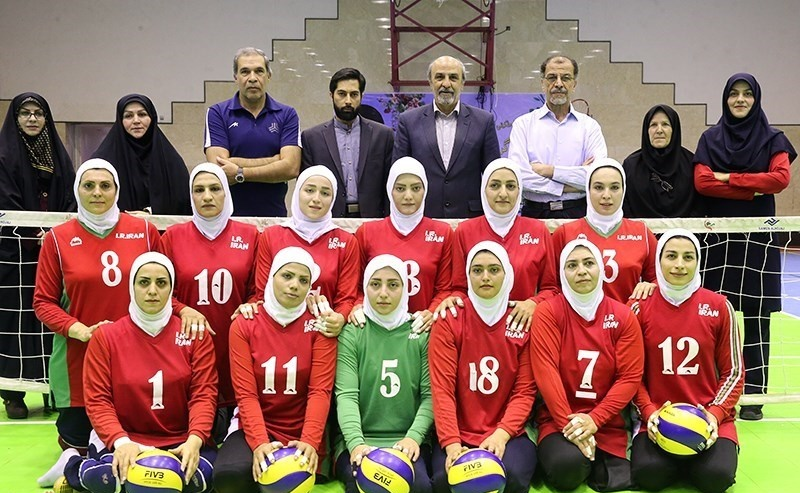
Iran's squad in August 2016

Iran women's national sitting volleyball team represents the country at international events.

== Paralympics ==
Iran women's national sitting volleyball team qualified for the 2016 Summer Paralympics after reaching the finals of the 2014 Asian Para Games, the first time the women's team had qualified for the Paralympics. They won the event, after beating China who had previously qualified for the 2016 Games at the world championships earlier in the year in sets of 25–15, 25–12, and 25–15. Maleki Zeinab Dizicheh and Abdi Zahra were the team's key players in the tournament. In the year before the Games, the team trained in Isfahan, where there were 20 members at camp along with players from the junior national team. Warm up events for the team include the March 2015 Intercontinental Cup.

== Staff ==
In 2015, Farid Saebi was serving as the team's technical director.

== See also ==
- Volleyball at the Summer Paralympics
- World Organization Volleyball for Disabled
