= Sitting volleyball at the 2016 Summer Paralympics – Women =

Sitting volleyball at the XV Paralympic Games
- Venue: Riocentro - Pavilion 6
- Dates: 9 – 18 September 2016
- Competitors: 96 from 8 nations

Medalists
1st place, gold medalist(s)		United States (1st title)
2nd place, silver medalist(s)		China
3rd place, bronze medalist(s)		Brazil

The women's tournament in sitting volleyball at the 2016 Summer Paralympics was held between 9–17 September 2016. The USA won the event for the first time beating China in the final.

== Results ==
The USA won the event for the first time beating China in the final.

=== Preliminary round ===
==== Group A ====
Pos	Team	Pld	W	L	Pts	SW	SL	SR	SPW	SPL	SPR	Qualification
1	Brazil (H)	3	3	0	6	9	0	MAX	225	140	1.607	Semi-finals
2	Ukraine	3	2	1	5	6	5	1.200	237	229	1.035	Semi-finals
3	Netherlands	3	1	2	4	5	7	0.714	250	265	0.943	Classification 5th / 6th
4	Canada	3	0	3	3	1	9	0.111	169	247	0.684	Classification 7th / 8th

Source: Paralympic.org
(H) Host

9 September 2016; 18:30	Brazil	3–0	Canada	Riocentro - Pavilion 6, Rio de Janeiro
9 September 2016; 18:30	(25–7, 25–12, 25–14); Report			Riocentro - Pavilion 6, Rio de Janeiro

9 September 2016; 20:30	Ukraine	3–2	Netherlands	Riocentro - Pavilion 6, Rio de Janeiro
9 September 2016; 20:30	(21–25, 22–25, 25–13, 26–24, 15–12); Report			Riocentro - Pavilion 6, Rio de Janeiro

11 September 2016; 14:00	Canada	1–3	Netherlands	Riocentro - Pavilion 6, Rio de Janeiro
11 September 2016; 14:00	(25–22, 17–25, 17–25, 22–25); Report			Riocentro - Pavilion 6, Rio de Janeiro

11 September 2016; 20:30	Brazil	3–0	Ukraine	Riocentro - Pavilion 6, Rio de Janeiro
11 September 2016; 20:30	(25–19, 25–20, 25–14); Report			Riocentro - Pavilion 6, Rio de Janeiro

13 September 2016; 10:00	Netherlands	0–3	Brazil	Riocentro - Pavilion 6, Rio de Janeiro
13 September 2016; 10:00	(18–25, 15–25, 21–25); Report			Riocentro - Pavilion 6, Rio de Janeiro

13 September 2016; 18:30	Ukraine	3–0	Canada	Riocentro - Pavilion 6, Rio de Janeiro
13 September 2016; 18:30	(25–20, 25–19, 25–16); Report			Riocentro - Pavilion 6, Rio de Janeiro

==== Group B ====
Pos	Team	Pld	W	L	Pts	SW	SL	SR	SPW	SPL	SPR	Qualification
1	China	3	3	0	6	9	2	4.500	246	169	1.456	Semi-finals
2	United States	3	2	1	5	8	3	2.667	256	156	1.641	Semi-finals
3	Iran	3	1	2	4	3	6	0.500	160	197	0.812	Classification 5th / 6th
4	Rwanda	3	0	3	3	0	9	0.000	85	225	0.378	Classification 7th / 8th

Source: Paralympic.org

10 September 2016; 10:00	China	3-0	Rwanda	Riocentro - Pavilion 6, Rio de Janeiro
10 September 2016; 10:00	(25–3, 25–8, 25–6); Report			Riocentro - Pavilion 6, Rio de Janeiro

10 September 2016; 14:00	United States	3-0	Iran	Riocentro - Pavilion 6, Rio de Janeiro
10 September 2016; 14:00	(25–17, 25–13, 25–9); Report			Riocentro - Pavilion 6, Rio de Janeiro

12 September 2016; 10:00	Rwanda	0–3	Iran	Riocentro - Pavilion 6, Rio de Janeiro
12 September 2016; 10:00	(10–25, 19–25, 18–25); Report			Riocentro - Pavilion 6, Rio de Janeiro

12 September 2016; 18:30	China	3–2	United States	Riocentro - Pavilion 6, Rio de Janeiro
12 September 2016; 18:30	(25–17, 14–25, 14–25, 28–26, 15–13); Report			Riocentro - Pavilion 6, Rio de Janeiro

14 September 2016; 10:00	United States	3–0	Rwanda	Riocentro - Pavilion 6, Rio de Janeiro
14 September 2016; 10:00	(25–10, 25–8, 25–3); Report			Riocentro - Pavilion 6, Rio de Janeiro

14 September 2016; 14:00	Iran	0–3	China	Riocentro - Pavilion 6, Rio de Janeiro
14 September 2016; 14:00	(16–25, 19–25, 11–25); Report			Riocentro - Pavilion 6, Rio de Janeiro

=== Knock-out stage ===
==== Bracket ====
Semi-finals
17 September
Brazil	0
United States	3
17 September
Ukraine	0
China	3

Gold medal
18 September
United States	3
China	0
Bronze medal
18 September
Brazil	3
Ukraine	0

==== Classification 7th / 8th ====
15 September 2016; 13:30	Canada	3–0	Rwanda	Riocentro - Pavilion 6, Rio de Janeiro
15 September 2016; 13:30	(25–21, 25–15, 25–20); Report			Riocentro - Pavilion 6, Rio de Janeiro

==== Classification 5th / 6th ====
15 September 2016; 15:30	Netherlands	2–3	Iran	Riocentro - Pavilion 6, Rio de Janeiro
15 September 2016; 15:30	(21–25, 23–25, 25–23, 25–15, 15–13); Report			Riocentro - Pavilion 6, Rio de Janeiro

==== Semi-finals ====
15 September 2016; 18:30	Ukraine	0–3	China	Riocentro - Pavilion 6, Rio de Janeiro
15 September 2016; 18:30	(14–25, 23–25, 20–25); Report			Riocentro - Pavilion 6, Rio de Janeiro

15 September 2016; 20:30	Brazil	0–3	United States	Riocentro - Pavilion 6, Rio de Janeiro
15 September 2016; 20:30	(13–25, 26–28, 18–25); Report			Riocentro - Pavilion 6, Rio de Janeiro

==== Bronze medal game ====
17 September 2016; 16:30	Brazil	3–0	Ukraine	Riocentro - Pavilion 6, Rio de Janeiro
17 September 2016; 16:30	(25–12, 25–22, 25–20); Report			Riocentro - Pavilion 6, Rio de Janeiro

==== Gold medal game ====
17 September 2016; 16:30	United States	3–0	China	Riocentro - Pavilion 6, Rio de Janeiro
17 September 2016; 16:30	(25–12, 25–12, 25–18); Report			Riocentro - Pavilion 6, Rio de Janeiro

== Final ranking ==
Rank	Team
Gold medal	United States
Silver medal	China
Bronze medal	Brazil
4	Ukraine
5	Iran
6	Netherlands
7	Canada
8	Rwanda

2016 Women's Paralympic Champions

United States
1st title

12-woman roster
Lora Webster, Bethany Zummo (L), Alexis Shifflett, Tia Edwards, Katie Holloway, Heather Erickson (c), Monique Burkland, Kaleo Kanahele, Nicky Nieves, Kari Miller, Nichole Millage, Michelle Schiffler
Head coach
Bill Hamiter

== See also ==
- Sitting volleyball at the 2016 Summer Paralympics – Men
