= Nathalie Filomena =

Brazilian Paralympic volleyball player (born 1990)

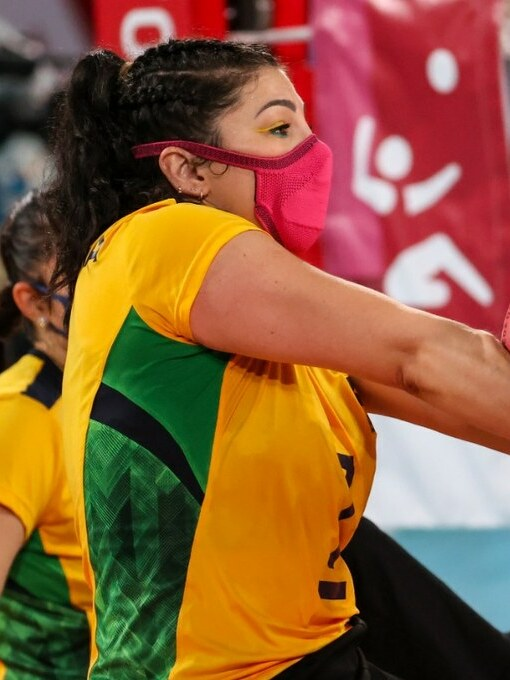
- Filomena at the 2020 Summer Paralympics

Personal information
- Full name: Nathalie Filomena de Lima Silva
- Born: 13 April 1990 (age 36); Jacareí, São Paulo, Brazil
Medal record
Women's sitting volleyball
Representing Brazil
Paralympic Games
Bronze medal – third place	2016 Rio	Team
Bronze medal – third place	2020 Tokyo	Team
World Championship
Gold medal – first place	2022 Sarajevo	Team
Parapan American Games
Silver medal – second place	2015 Toronto	Team
Silver medal – second place	2019 Lima	Team

Nathalie Filomena de Lima Silva (born 13 April 1990) is a Brazilian Paralympic volleyball player.

== Biography and career ==
Filomena is from Jacareí, São Paulo. She was born with a plexobranchial lesion in her left arm and had impaired movement, in addition to being born with mild paralysis on that same side. She played conventional volleyball since childhood and discovered sitting volleyball at the age of fifteen. She has a degree in physical education and teaches swimming at the city hall of Suzano.

Filomena was a member of the Brazilian women's sitting volleyball team at the 2015 Parapan American Games in Toronto, where she won a silver medal. She competed at the 2016 Summer Paralympics, where the team won the bronze medal after defeating Ukraine 3–0. At the 2019 Parapan American Games in Lima, she won a silver medal again after losing to the United States team 3–0. At the 2020 Summer Paralympics in Tokyo, the team lost to the United States in the semi-finals, but won the bronze medal after beating Canada 3–1.

In November 2022, Filomena won the World Championship with the Brazilian national team in Sarajevo, Bosnia and Herzegovina, after a 3–2 victory over Canada.
