= Sarah Melenka =

Canadian sitting volleyball player (born 1998)

Personal information
- Born: November 9, 1998 (age 27) Vegreville, Alberta, Canada

Sport
- Sport: Sitting volleyball
- Disability class: VS2
Medal record
Women's sitting volleyball
Representing Canada
Paralympic Games
Bronze medal – third place	2024 Paris	Team
World Championship
Silver medal – second place	2022 Sarajevo	Team
Parapan American Games
Bronze medal – third place	2019 Lima	Team

Sarah Melenka (born November 9, 1998) is a Canadian sitting volleyball player.

== Career ==
Melenka competed at the World Para Volleyball Championship in 2022 and won a silver medal, Canada's first ever medal in sitting volleyball at a major international event.

On July 22, 2024, she was named to Canada's roster to compete at the 2024 Summer Paralympics. She won a bronze medal in sitting volleyball, Canada's first ever medal in the event.

== Personal life ==
In 2014, Melenka was diagnosed with compartment syndrome. In 2015, she underwent nine surgeries to help saver her leg. The surgeries were successful, however, she has 30 percent muscle deficiency in her right calf.
