= Jolan Wong =

Canadian sitting volleyball player (born 1990)

Personal information
- Born: January 20, 1990 (age 36) Edmonton, Alberta, Canada

Sport
- Sport: Sitting volleyball
- Disability class: VS1
Medal record
Women's sitting volleyball
Representing Canada
Paralympic Games
Bronze medal – third place	2024 Paris	Team
World Championship
Silver medal – second place	2022 Sarajevo	Team
Parapan American Games
Bronze medal – third place	2015 Toronto	Team
Bronze medal – third place	2019 Lima	Team

Jolan Wong (born January 20, 1990) is a Canadian sitting volleyball player.

== Career ==
Wong competed at the World Para Volleyball Championship in 2022 and won a silver medal, Canada's first ever medal in sitting volleyball at a major international event.

On July 22, 2024, she was named to Canada's roster to compete at the 2024 Summer Paralympics. She won a bronze medal in sitting volleyball, Canada's first ever medal in the event.

== Personal life ==
Wong was diagnosed with bone cancer at 12 years old which resulted in her leg being amputated at 13 years old.
