= Jennifer Oakes (volleyball) =

Canadian sitting volleyball player (born 1998)

Personal information
- Full name: Jennifer Gerilyn Oakes
- Born: February 4, 1998 (age 28) Calgary, Alberta, Canada

Sport
- Sport: Sitting volleyball
- Disability class: VS1
Medal record
Women's sitting volleyball
Representing Canada
Paralympic Games
Bronze medal – third place	2024 Paris	Team
World Championship
Silver medal – second place	2022 Sarajevo	Team
Parapan American Games
Bronze medal – third place	2019 Lima	Team

Jennifer Gerilyn Oakes (born February 4, 1998) is a Canadian sitting volleyball player.

== Career ==
Oakes competed at the World Para Volleyball Championship in 2022 and won a silver medal, Canada's first ever medal in sitting volleyball at a major international event.

On July 22, 2024, she was named to Canada's roster to compete at the 2024 Summer Paralympics. She won a bronze medal in sitting volleyball, Canada's first ever medal in the event.

== Personal life ==
In July 2015, Oakes injured her right leg in a boating accident. She wasn't holding on and was knocked off the front of the boat and run over. The propeller narrowly missed her head and torso. Doctors were forced to amputate her leg below the knee.
