= Heidi Peters =

Canadian sitting volleyball player (born 1994)

Personal information
- Born: October 12, 1994 (age 31) Edmonton, Alberta, Canada

Sport
- Sport: Sitting volleyball
- Disability class: VS1
Medal record
Women's sitting volleyball
Representing Canada
Paralympic Games
Bronze medal – third place	2024 Paris	Team
World Championship
Silver medal – second place	2022 Sarajevo	Team
Parapan American Games
Bronze medal – third place	2015 Toronto	Team
Bronze medal – third place	2019 Lima	Team

Heidi Peters (born October 12, 1994) is a Canadian sitting volleyball player.

== Career ==
Peters competed at the World Para Volleyball Championship in 2022 and won a silver medal, Canada's first ever medal in sitting volleyball at a major international event.

On July 22, 2024, she was named to Canada's roster to compete at the 2024 Summer Paralympics. She won a bronze medal in sitting volleyball, Canada's first ever medal in the event.

== Personal life ==
Peters was diagnosed with bone cancer in her left leg at 16 years old. She underwent chemotherapy, however, the cancer did not go away, and as a result she underwent amputation of her leg below the knee.
