= Felicia Voss-Shafiq =

Canadian sitting volleyball player (born 1980)

Personal information
- Born: April 25, 1980 (age 46) Suva, Fiji
- Home town: Burnaby, British Columbia, Canada

Sport
- Sport: Sitting volleyball
- Disability class: VS1
Medal record
Women's sitting volleyball
Representing Canada
Paralympic Games
| Bronze medal – third place | 2024 Paris | Team |
World Championship
| Silver medal – second place | 2022 Sarajevo | Team |
Parapan American Games
| Bronze medal – third place | 2015 Toronto | Team |
| Bronze medal – third place | 2019 Lima | Team |

Felicia Voss-Shafiq (born April 25, 1980) is a Canadian sitting volleyball player.

== Early life ==
Voss-Shafiq was born and raised in Fiji before moving to San Francisco, California at 12 years old.

== Career ==
Voss-Shafiq competed at the World Para Volleyball Championship in 2022 and won a silver medal, Canada's first ever medal in sitting volleyball at a major international event.

On July 22, 2024, she was named to Canada's roster to compete at the 2024 Summer Paralympics. She won a bronze medal in sitting volleyball, Canada's first ever medal in the event.

== Personal life ==
In 2011, Voss-Shafiq suffered a bad case of pneumonia that caused blood poisoning, and sent her into septic shock and a coma. She later became a double below the knee amputee as a result of her illness.
