= Allison Lang =

Canadian sitting volleyball player (born 1993)

Personal information
- Born: September 3, 1993 (age 32) Edmonton, Alberta, Canada

Sport
- Sport: Sitting volleyball
- Disability class: VS1
Medal record
Women's sitting volleyball
Representing Canada
Paralympic Games
Bronze medal – third place	2024 Paris	Team
World Championship
Silver medal – second place	2022 Sarajevo	Team

Allison Lang (born September 3, 1993) is a Canadian sitting volleyball player.

== Career ==
Lang competed at the World Championship in 2022 and won a silver medal, Canada's first ever medal in sitting volleyball at a major international event.

On July 22, 2024, she was named to Canada's roster to compete at the 2024 Summer Paralympics. She won a bronze medal in sitting volleyball, Canada's first ever medal in the event.
