= Anne Fergusson =

Canadian sitting volleyball player (born 1995)

Personal information
- Born: October 11, 1995 (age 30) Smiths Falls, Ontario, Canada

Sport
- Sport: Sitting volleyball
- Disability class: VS1
Medal record
Women's sitting volleyball
Representing Canada
Paralympic Games
Bronze medal – third place	2024 Paris	Team
World Championship
Silver medal – second place	2022 Sarajevo	Team
Parapan American Games
Bronze medal – third place	2015 Toronto	Team
Bronze medal – third place	2019 Lima	Team

Anne Fergusson (born October 11, 1995) is a Canadian sitting volleyball player.

== Career ==
Fergusson competed at the World Para Volleyball Championship in 2022 and won a silver medal, Canada's first ever medal in sitting volleyball at a major international event.

On July 22, 2024, she was named to Canada's roster to compete at the 2024 Summer Paralympics. She won a bronze medal in sitting volleyball, Canada's first ever medal in the event.

== Personal life ==
Fergusson was born without a left hand.
