= Sitting volleyball at the 2024 Summer Paralympics =

Sitting volleyball at the XVII Paralympic Games
- Paralympic Sitting Volleyball
- Venue: Parc des Expositions de Villepinte
- Dates: 29 August to 7 September 2024
- Competitors: 192 from 14 nations

Sitting volleyball at the 2024 Summer Paralympics in Paris, France took place between 29 August and 7 September 2024 and included two team events: one for men and one for women.

== Qualification ==
=== Qualification summary ===
Nation	Men's	Women's	Athletes
Bosnia and Herzegovina	Yes		12
Brazil	Yes	Yes	24
Canada		Yes	12
China		Yes	12
Egypt	Yes		12
France	Yes	Yes	24
Germany	Yes		12
Iran	Yes		12
Italy		Yes	12
Kazakhstan	Yes		12
Rwanda		Yes	12
Slovenia		Yes	12
Ukraine	Yes		12
United States		Yes	12
Total: 14 NOCs	96	96	192

=== Men ===
Means of qualification	Date	Venue	Berths	Qualified
Host country allocation	—N/a	—N/a	1	France
2022 Sitting Volleyball World Championships	4–11 November 2022	(Bosnia and Herzegovina) Sarajevo	1	Iran
2023 Pan American Sitting Volleyball Championships	9–13 May 2023	(Canada) Edmonton	1	Brazil
2023 Asia and Oceania Sitting Volleyball Championships	3–8 July 2023	(Kazakhstan) Astana	1	Kazakhstan
2023 Sitting Volleyball European Championships	9–15 October 2023	(Italy) Caorle	1	Bosnia and Herzegovina
2023 Sitting Volleyball World Cup	11–18 November 2023	(Egypt) Cairo	1	Germany
2024 African Sitting Volleyball Championships	29 January–3 February 2024	(Nigeria) Lagos	1	Egypt
2024 Paralympic Final Qualification Tournament	3–10 April 2024	(China) Dali	1	Ukraine
Total			8	

=== Women ===
Means of qualification	Date	Venue	Berths	Qualified
Host country allocation	—N/a	—N/a	1	France
2022 Sitting Volleyball World Championships	4–11 November 2022	(Bosnia and Herzegovina) Sarajevo	1	Brazil
2023 Pan American Sitting Volleyball Championships	9–13 May 2023	(Canada) Edmonton	1	United States
2023 Asia and Oceania Sitting Volleyball Championships	3–8 July 2023	(Kazakhstan) Astana	1	China
2023 Sitting Volleyball European Championships	9–15 October 2023	(Italy) Caorle	1	Italy
2023 Sitting Volleyball World Cup	12–18 November 2023	(Egypt) Cairo	1	Canada
2024 African Sitting Volleyball Championships	29 January–3 February 2024	(Nigeria) Lagos	1	Rwanda
2024 Paralympic Final Qualification Tournament	3–10 April 2024	(China) Dali	1	Slovenia
Total			8	

== Medalists ==
Event	Gold	Silver	Bronze
Men's team	Iran; Hamidreza Abbasifeshki; Morteza Mehrzad; Meisam Ali Pour; Davoud Alipourian; Meysam Hajibabaei Movahhed; Mohammed Nemati; Sadegh Bigdeli; Majid Lashkarisanami; Hossein Golestani; Isa Zirahi; Ramezan Salehihajikolaei; Mahdi Babadi	Bosnia and Herzegovina; Ismet Godinjak; Adnan Manko; Stevan Crnobrnja; Armin Šehić; Asim Medić; Mirzet Duran; Nizam Čančar; Edin Dino; Sabahudin Delalić; Safet Alibašić; Dževad Hamzić; Ermin Jusufović	Egypt; Hesham Elshwikh; Mohamed Hamdy Elsoudany; Ashraf Zaghloul Abdelaziz Abdalla; Ahmed Mohammed Soliman Khamis; Ahmed Mohammed Fadl; Hossam Massoud; Elsayed Moussa Saad Moussa; Abdelnaby Hassan Ahmed Abdellatif; Zakareia Abdo; Mohamed Abouelyazeid; Ahmed Zikry; Metawa Abouelkhir
Women's team	United States; Heather Erickson; Monique Matthews; Whitney Dosty; Kaleo Kanahele Maclay; Lora Webster; Nicky Nieves; Tia Edwards; Bethany Zummo; Alexis Shifflett; Sydney Satchell; Katie Holloway Bridge; Emma Schieck	China; Lyu Hongqin; Zhao Meiling; Qiu Junfei; Zhang Xufei; Li Ting; Huang Lu; Wang Yanan; Zhang Lijun; Su Limei; Tang Xuemei; Xu Yixiao; Hu Huizi	Canada; Julie Kozun; Allison Lang; Felicia Voss-Shafiq; Anne Fergusson; Jolan Wong; Heidi Peters; Sarah Melenka; Jennifer McCreesh; Katelyn Wright; Jennifer Oakes; Danielle Ellis

== See also ==
- Volleyball at the 2024 Summer Olympics
