= Julie Kozun =

Canadian sitting volleyball player (born 1999)

Personal information
- Full name: Julie Anne Kozun
- Born: December 23, 1999 (age 26) Melfort, Saskatchewan, Canada

Sport
- Sport: Sitting volleyball
- Disability class: VS1
Medal record
Women's sitting volleyball
Representing Canada
Paralympic Games
Bronze medal – third place	2024 Paris	Team
World Championship
Silver medal – second place	2022 Sarajevo	Team
Parapan American Games
Bronze medal – third place	2019 Lima	Team

Julie Anne Kozun (born December 23, 1999) is a Canadian sitting volleyball player.

== Career ==
Kozun competed at the World Para Volleyball Championship in 2022 and won a silver medal, Canada's first ever medal in sitting volleyball at a major international event.

On July 22, 2024, she was named to Canada's roster to compete at the 2024 Summer Paralympics. She won a bronze medal in sitting volleyball, Canada's first ever medal in the event.

== Personal life ==
Kozun lost her left leg below the knee in a lawnmower accident in 2015.
