= Kaleo Kanahele Maclay =

American Paralympic volleyballer

Kaleo Kanahele

Personal information
- Full name: Kaleo Okalani Kanahele Maclay
- Born: June 11, 1996 (age 30); Oklahoma City, Oklahoma, U.S.
- Hometown: Oklahoma City, Oklahoma, U.S.
- Height: 5 ft 7 in (1.70 m)
Medal record
Women's sitting volleyball
Representing United States
Paralympic Games
| Gold medal – first place | 2016 Rio | Team |
| Gold medal – first place | 2024 Paris | Team |
| Silver medal – second place | 2012 London | Team |
World Championships
| Silver medal – second place | 2010 Edmond | Team |
Parapan American Games
| Gold medal – first place | 2015 Toronto | Team |
| Gold medal – first place | 2019 Lima | Team |
Parapan American Championship
| Gold medal – first place | 2010 Denver | Team |
Parapan American Zonal Championships
| Gold medal – first place | 2011 Sao Paulo | Team |
ECVD Continental Cup
| Gold medal – first place | 2011 Yevpatoria | Team |
Volleyball Masters
| Gold medal – first place | 2012 Leersum | Team |

Kaleo Okalani Kanahele Maclay (born June 11, 1996) is an American Paralympic volleyballist.

== Early life ==
Kanahele was born in Oklahoma City, Oklahoma, with a clubbed left foot. When she turned 9 months old her surgeon performed a tenotomy, but it didn't yield anything positive. Since that time her leg has been shorter than the other with a small calf muscle that is not very flexible. She started playing basketball at the age of 7 and a year later started softball. In softball, she played the first baseman position for Oklahoma Reign. By age 9 she started playing volleyball and at age 10 played it for Oklahoma Peak Performance. Due to her, the team took 42nd place in the USA Volleyball Girls’ Junior National championships. In 2009, the same team took 18th place. In her spare time Kanahele likes to listen to Kings of Leon music group.

== Career ==
She started competing in sitting volleyball, a sport in the Paralympic Games, in 2010 where she won a gold medal for competing at Parapan American Championship which was held in Colorado and a silver one for a WOVD Championship. In 2011 and 2012 respectively she won three gold medals at ECVD Continental Cup, Parapan American Zonal Championship, and Volleyball Masters. She also got 2nd silver medal for competing at 2012 Paralympic Games, her first Paralympic Games, in London.

In June 2014 she competed at the World Championships in Elblag, Poland at which she and Nicky Nieves each scored 7 points in a match against China. The Team USA scored 23–25, 25–22, 19–25, 25–21, 17–15 as overall victory.

She was part of the USA team which won the gold at 2015 Parapan American Games in Toronto, Canada.
