= Zhao Meiling =

Chinese sitting volleyball player

Personal information
- Born: 16 March 1987 (age 39) Liaoning, China

Sport
- Sport: Sitting volleyball
Medal record
Representing China
Paralympic Games
Silver medal – second place	2016 Rio de Janeiro	Team
Silver medal – second place	2020 Tokyo	Team
Silver medal – second place	2024 Paris	Team
Asian Para Games
Gold medal – first place	2014 Incheon	Team
Gold medal – first place	2018 Jakarta	Team
Gold medal – first place	2022 Hangzhou	Team

Zhao Meiling (Chinese: 赵美玲; pinyin: Zhào Měilíng; born 16 March 1987) is a Chinese sitting volleyball player who competes in international volleyball competitions. She is a three-time Paralympic medalist and three-time Asian Para Games champion.
