= Heather Erickson =

American sitting volleyball player

Personal information
- Full name: Heather Nicole Erickson
- Born: May 9, 1993 (age 33); Eureka, California, U.S.
- Hometown: Fayetteville, North Carolina, U.S.
- Height: 6 ft 0 in (183 cm)
Medal record
Women's sitting volleyball
Representing United States
Paralympic Games
Gold medal – first place	2016 Rio de Janeiro	Team
Gold medal – first place	2020 Tokyo	Team
Gold medal – first place	2024 Paris	Team
Silver medal – second place	2008 Beijing	Team
Silver medal – second place	2012 London	Team
World Championships
Silver medal – second place	2010 Edmond, Oklahoma	Team
WOVD Intercontinental Cup
Bronze medal – third place	2008 Ismailia, Egypt	Team
WOVD World Cup
Gold medal – first place	2010 Port Said, Egypt	Team
Parapan American Games
Gold medal – first place	2015 Toronto	Team
Gold medal – first place	2019 Lima	Team
Parapan American Zonal Championships
Gold medal – first place	2009 Denver, Colorado	Team
Gold medal – first place	2011 Sao Paulo, Brazil	Team
Parapan American Championship
Gold medal – first place	2010 Denver, Colorado	Team
Sitting Volleyball Invitational
Silver medal – second place	2007 Shanghai, China	Team
Euro Cup
Gold medal – first place	2009 Roermond, Netherlands	Team
ECVD Continental Cup
Gold medal – first place	2011 Yevpatoria, Ukraine	Team
Volleyball Masters
Gold medal – first place	2012 Leersum, Netherlands	Team

Heather Nicole Erickson (born May 9, 1993) is an American Paralympic sitting volleyball player.

== Early life ==
Erickson was born in Eureka, California with a bone that prevented her leg from fully developing. In 2002, after 18 failed surgeries, her parents decided to have her right leg amputated. She received a prosthetic leg a month later. In 2011, she graduated from Jack Britt High School in Fayetteville, North Carolina.

== Career ==
She started competing for Paralympic Games in 2007 where she won a silver medal for her participation at Sitting Volleyball Invitational. In 2008, she participated at World Organization Volleyball for Disabled where she won bronze medal and the same year got another silver one for her participation at 2008 Paralympic Games in Beijing, China. In 2010, Erickson won gold medal at Parapan American Championship which was held in Colorado and the same year got another gold and silver ones for a WOVD Championship and World Cup. In 2011 and 2012 respectively she won three gold medals at ECVD Continental Cup, Parapan American Zonal Championship, and Volleyball Masters. She also got 4th silver medal for her participation at 2012 Paralympic Games in London.

Erickson was a member of the USA Paralympic women's volleyball team which won the gold medal at the 2015 Parapan American Games in Toronto, at the 2016 Summer Paralympics in Rio de Janeiro, and at the 2020 Summer Paralympics in Tokyo.

== Personal life and interests ==
Erickson likes to listen to such singers as Maroon 5 and Blake Shelton. She also enjoys watching such films as Game Plan, Gridiron Gang and August Rush. She likes to watch TV shows as well such as House, and WWE Raw. Her other hobbies are reading Nicholas Sparks books, and playing volleyball.
