= Sydney Satchell =

American sitting volleyball player (born 1992)

Personal information
- Full name: Sydney Chanel Satchell
- Born: April 23, 1992 (age 34) Windsor, Connecticut, U.S
- Education: Howard University
- Height: 5 ft 2 in (157 cm)

Sport
- Sport: Sitting volleyball
- Position: Libero
Medal record
Women's sitting volleyball
Representing the United States
Paralympic Games
Gold medal – first place	2024 Paris	Team
World Championship
Bronze medal – third place	2022 Sarajevo	Team
Parapan American Games
Gold medal – first place	2019 Lima	Team

Sydney Chanel Satchell (born April 23, 1992) is an American sitting volleyball player.

== Early life and education ==
Satchell attended Ethel Walker School in Simsbury, Connecticut where she played soccer, basketball and lacrosse. She then attended Howard University where she played college lacrosse for three years.

== Career ==
Satchell has been a member of the national team since 2019. She made her international debut for the United States at the 2019 Parapan American Games and won a gold medal.

Satchell competed at the World Para Volleyball Championship in 2022 and won a bronze medal.

On July 10, 2024, she was named to team USA's roster to compete at the 2024 Summer Paralympics.

== Personal life ==
On January 15, 2015, Satchell was involved in a car accident while driving to work on an icy road. She swerved to avoid an oncoming truck, and hit a tree. Her left leg was pinned to the door, and she was stuck in the vehicle for over 40 minutes. Her injuries included a concussion, a partially fractured nose, two dead arteries that went down to her left foot, nerve damage to the lower part of her left leg and a leg fracture in three places. After her first surgery where doctors put a rod in her leg to address her bones being broken in three places, she developed compartment syndrome. After four more surgeries, doctors were unable to save her leg. Six weeks after the accident, her leg was amputated below the knee.
