= Alexis Shifflett =

American sitting volleyball player (born 1996)

Personal information
- Full name: Alexis Ann Shifflett-Patterson
- Nickname: Lexi
- Born: May 12, 1996 (age 30) Owatonna, Minnesota, U.S
- Home town: Waseca, Minnesota, U.S
- Height: 5 ft 4 in (163 cm)

Sport
- Sport: Sitting volleyball
- Position: Setter
- Disability: Fibular hemimelia
Medal record
Women's sitting volleyball
Representing the United States
Paralympic Games
Gold medal – first place	2016 Rio de Janeiro	Team
Gold medal – first place	2020 Tokyo	Team
Gold medal – first place	2024 Paris	Team
World Championship
Silver medal – second place	2014 Elblag	Team
Silver medal – second place	2018 Arnhem	Team
Bronze medal – third place	2022 Sarajevo	Team
Parapan American Games
Gold medal – first place	2015 Toronto	Team
Gold medal – first place	2019 Lima	Team

Alexis Ann Shifflett-Patterson (born May 12, 1996) is an American sitting volleyball player.

== Early life ==
Shifflett attended Waseca High School where she played softball and volleyball all four years. She was named the captain of her volleyball team her senior year. She was introduced to sitting volleyball at 15 years old, and made her first national team roster at 16 years old.

== Career ==
Shifflett competed at the World Para Volleyball Championship and won silver medals in 2014 and 2018. She again competed at the World Championship in 2022 and won a bronze medal.

She represented the United States at the 2015 Parapan American Games and won a gold medal. She again represented the United States at the 2019 Parapan American Games and won a gold medal.

She represented the United States at the 2016 Summer Paralympics in sitting volleyball and won a gold medal. She again represented the United States at the 2020 Summer Paralympics in sitting volleyball and won a gold medal. On July 10, 2024, she was named to team USA's roster to compete at the 2024 Summer Paralympics.

== Personal life ==
Shifflett was born to John and Katie Shifflett, and has two sisters named Natalie and Michaela. She was born with fibular hemimelia, and without her ankle bones and a few toes on her right leg. She had her foot amputated at nine months old.

She married Alexander Patterson on November 27, 2021.
