= Jillian Williams =

American sitting volleyball player (born 1997)

Personal information
- Born: March 5, 1997 (age 29) Corpus Christi, Texas, U.S
- Height: 5 ft 10 in (178 cm)

Sport
- Sport: Sitting volleyball
Medal record
Women's sitting volleyball
Representing the United States
Paralympic Games
Gold medal – first place	2020 Tokyo	Team
World Championship
Silver medal – second place	2018 Arnhem	Team
Parapan American Games
Gold medal – first place	2019 Lima	Team

Jillian Williams (born March 5, 1997) is an American sitting volleyball player. She has competed at the World Para Volleyball Championships, Parapan American Games, and Summer Paralympics, winning a medal in each of these events.

== Early life and education ==
Williams was born to parents Trey and Janna Williams on March 5, 1997, in Corpus Christi, Texas. She has an older brother named Trent. On February 29, 2016, Williams was diagnosed with Ewing's sarcoma in her left leg had the lower part of that leg amputated five months later. She graduated from Texas Lutheran University and later the University of Central Oklahoma.

== Career ==
Williams competed at the World Para Volleyball Championship and won a silver medal in 2018. She also represented the United States at the 2019 Parapan American Games and won a gold medal. Williams again represented the United States at the 2020 Summer Paralympics in sitting volleyball and won a gold medal. She also competed at the Golden Nations League in 2021, as well as the Dutch Tournament in 2022, winning both of them.

== Personal life ==
Williams married Kyle Coffee in 2020.
