= Whitney Dosty =

American sitting volleyball player (born 1988)

Personal information
- Full name: Whitney Jenay Dosty
- Born: February 25, 1988 (age 38) Tucson, Arizona, U.S
- Education: University of Arizona
- Height: 6 ft 3 in (191 cm)

Volleyball information
- Position: Outside hitter

Career
- Years: Team
- 2010–2011: (Puerto Rico) Gigantes de Carolina
- 2011–2012: (Switzerland) Hôtel Cristal VFM
- 2012–2013: (South Korea) Heungkuk Life
- 2013–2014: (Azerbaijan) Lokomotiv Baku
Medal record
Women's sitting volleyball
Representing the United States
Paralympic Games
Gold medal – first place	2020 Tokyo	Team
Gold medal – first place	2024 Paris	Team
World Championship
Silver medal – second place	2018 Arnhem	Team
Bronze medal – third place	2022 Sarajevo	Team

Whitney Jenay Dosty (born February 25, 1988) is an American sitting volleyball player.

== Early life and education ==
Dosty attended Salpointe Catholic High School where she played volleyball. She was named the 2005 Southern Arizona Player of the Year by both the Arizona Daily Star and the Tucson Citizen. She also participated in track and field where she was the 2006 Arizona state high jump champion and placed third in the triple jump. She was ranked as the fourth-best recruit in the nation by PrepVolleyball.com.

She played volleyball at Arizona. During her freshman year in 2006 she appeared in all 109 games and 30 matches, with 23 starts. She ranked second on the team in kills with 369 and kills per game at 3.39, and ranked fourth on the team with 71 blocks. Her 369 kills rank sixth in Arizona freshman history. Following the season she was named to the Pac-10 All-Freshman team. She missed the 2007 season due to knee injuries. She finished her career with 1,278 career kills, which ranks eighth in Arizona history. In 2022 she was inducted to the Arizona Volleyball Ring of Honor.

== Career ==
Following her college career, Dosty played professional standing volleyball in Puerto Rico, Switzerland, Korea, Azerbaijan and Turkey. While she was playing in Turkey she suffered a dislocated ankle in 2014 that ended her standing volleyball career. She underwent three surgeries on her ankle, however, medical treatment and physical therapy were only temporary fixes, and she then transitioned to sitting volleyball.

She made her international debut at the World Para Volleyball Championship in 2018 and won a silver medal. She again competed at the World Championship in 2022 and won a bronze medal. She represented the United States at the 2020 Summer Paralympics in sitting volleyball and won a gold medal. On July 10, 2024, she was named to team USA's roster to compete at the 2024 Summer Paralympics.

== Personal life ==
Dosty was born to Robbie and Toni Dosty, and has an older sister, Sybil. Her father played college basketball at Arizona and her sister played basketball at University of Tennessee and Arizona State.

She is also a swimsuit designer for women with long torsos, and the founder of Wavelength Swimwear.
