= Lora Webster =

American Paralympic volleyball player

Personal information
- Full name: Lora Webster-Bargellini
- Born: Lora Jessica Webster; August 26, 1986 (age 40); Phoenix, Arizona, U.S.
- Hometown: Point Lookout, New York, U.S.
- Height: 5 ft 11 in (180 cm)
Medal record
Women's sitting volleyball
Representing United States
Paralympic Games
Gold medal – first place	2016 Rio	Team
Gold medal – first place	2020 Tokyo	Team
Gold medal – first place	2024 Paris	Team
Silver medal – second place	2008 Beijing	Team
Silver medal – second place	2012 London	Team
Bronze medal – third place	2004 Athens	Team
Sitting Volleyball World Championship
Silver medal – second place	2006 Netherlands	Team
Sitting Volleyball Invitational
Silver medal – second place	2007 Shanghai, China	Team
WOVD Intercontinental Cup
Bronze medal – third place	2008 Ismailia, Egypt	Team
Euro Cup
Gold medal – first place	2009 Roermond, Netherlands	Team
WOVD World Cup
Gold medal – first place	2010 Port Said, Egypt	Team
Volleyball Masters
Gold medal – first place	2012 Leersum, Netherlands	Team
Parapan American Games
Gold medal – first place	2003 Mar del Plata	Team
Gold medal – first place	2019 Lima	Team
Parapan American Zonal Championships
Gold medal – first place	2009 Denver, Colorado	Team
Parapan American Championship
Gold medal – first place	2010 Denver, Colorado	Team

Lora Jessica Webster (born August 26, 1986) is an American Paralympic volleyballist. She won a 2018 Theresa Award.

== Early life ==
Webster was born in Phoenix, Arizona. By the time she turned 11 she was diagnosed with osteosarcoma in her left tibia. She underwent a rotationplasty procedure to remove the cancerous bone, and lost her knee that way. In 1998 she got a prosthetic leg. In 2004, she graduated from Cactus Shadows High School in Cave Creek, Arizona with the Gene Autry Courage Award. While she was in high school she competed in track and diving at Lincoln East High School in Lincoln, Nebraska.

== Career ==
In 2003, she won a gold medal in Parapan American Games and in 2004 participated in 2004 Paralympic Games, where she won a bronze medal. She won a silver medal for her participation at 2008 Paralympic Games in Beijing, China. The same year she got a bronze medal for her participation at World Organization Volleyball for Disabled where she also won an Intercontinental Cup. She also got two gold medals in 2009, one for Parapan American Zonal Championship and another for EuroCup. In 2016, she competed at the 2016 Summer Paralympics. At the 2016 Rio Games she won a gold medal. At the 2018 World ParaVolley World Championships, she won a silver medal. At the 2020 Tokyo Summer Paralympics, realized in 2021, she won a gold medal.

== Personal life ==
Webster married Paul Bargellini in 2010. Together they have 2 daughters and two sons. In the February 2006 issue of Cosmopolitan magazine, she was named Cosmo's first Fun Fearless Female Reader and also won a prize of $10,000. She studied broadcasting at the University of Central Oklahoma. In 2017, she graduated from Stony Brook University.

In 2019, Webster announced her candidacy for Town of Hempstead Town Council as a Democrat.
