= Laiana Batista =

Brazilian sitting volleyball player (born 1982)

Personal information
- Full name: Laiana Rodrigues Batista
- Born: 8 May 1982 (age 44); Manaus, Amazonas, Brazil
Medal record
Women's sitting volleyball
Representing Brazil
Paralympic Games
Bronze medal – third place	2016 Rio	Team
Bronze medal – third place	2020 Tokyo	Team
Parapan American Games
Silver medal – second place	2015 Toronto	Team
Silver medal – second place	2019 Lima	Team

Laiana Rodrigues Batista (born 8 May 1982) is a Brazilian sitting volleyball player.

== Biography and career ==
Batista is from Manaus, Amazonas. She was already a conventional volleyball player when, at the age of eighteen, she had hemorrhagic dengue fever and the manifestation of Guillain-Barré syndrome. Her legs were paralyzed and her right foot fell off. She discovered the Paralympic sport fifteen years later, at the age of 33.

Batista was a member of the Brazilian women's sitting volleyball Team at the 2015 Parapan American Games in Toronto, where she won a silver medal. She made her Paralympic debut at Rio 2016, where the team won the bronze medal after defeating Ukraine 3 sets to 0. At the 2019 Parapan American Games in Lima, they again won the silver medal after losing to the United States team by 3 sets to 0. At the 2020 Summer Paralympics in Tokyo, the team lost to the United States in the semi-finals, but won the bronze medal after beating Canada by 3 sets to 1.
