= Tia Edwards =

American sitting volleyball player (born 1995)

Personal information
- Full name: Tia Mackenzie Edwards
- Born: April 8, 1995 (age 31) Claremore, Oklahoma, U.S
- Height: 5 ft 6 in (168 cm)

Sport
- Sport: Sitting volleyball
Medal record
Women's sitting volleyball
Representing the United States
Paralympic Games
Gold medal – first place	2016 Rio de Janeiro	Team
Gold medal – first place	2024 Paris	Team
World Championship
Silver medal – second place	2018 Arnhem	Team
Bronze medal – third place	2022 Sarajevo	Team
Parapan American Games
Gold medal – first place	2015 Toronto	Team
Gold medal – first place	2019 Lima	Team

Tia Mackenzie Edwards (born April 8, 1995) is an American sitting volleyball player.

== Career ==
Edwards competed at the World Para Volleyball Championship and won a silver medal in 2018. She again competed at the World Championship in 2022 and won a bronze medal.

She represented the United States at the 2015 Parapan American Games and won a gold medal. She again represented the United States at the 2019 Parapan American Games and won a gold medal.

She represented the United States at the 2016 Summer Paralympics in sitting volleyball and won a gold medal. On July 10, 2024, she was named to team USA's roster to compete at the 2024 Summer Paralympics.

== Personal life ==
Edwards was born to Dalton Edwards and Mica Pattillo, and has two sisters, Mikayla Shulanberger and Millie Pattillo, and a brother, Ryan Edwards. She was born with congenital birth defect to her left hand.
