= Nichole Millage =

American Paralympic volleyballer (born 1977)

Nichole Millage Faust
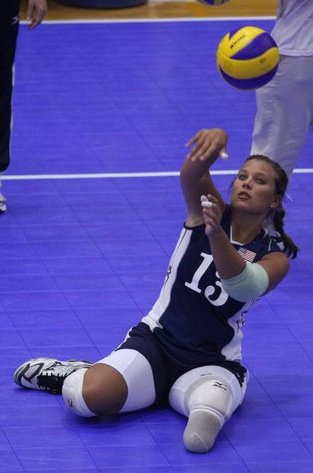
- Millage at the 2010 World Championships in Edmond, Oklahoma

Personal information
- Full name: Nichole Ann Millage Faust
- Nationality: American
- Born: March 27, 1977 (age 49); Champaign, Illinois, U.S.
- Hometown: Champaign, Illinois, U.S.
- Height: 5 ft 7 in (170 cm)
Medal record
Women's sitting volleyball
Representing United States
Paralympic Games
Silver medal – second place	2008 Beijing	Team
Silver medal – second place	2012 London	Team
Gold medal – first place	2016 Rio de Janeiro	Team
Gold medal – first place	2020 Tokyo	Team
World Championships
Silver medal – second place	2010 Edmond, Oklahoma	Team
Silver medal – second place	2014 Elblag, Poland	Team
Silver medal – second place	2018 Arnhem, Netherlands	Team
WOVD Intercontinental Cup
Bronze medal – third place	2008 Ismailia, Egypt	Team
WOVD World Cup
Gold medal – first place	2010 Port Said, Egypt	Team
Parapan American Games
Gold medal – first place	2015 Toronto	Team
Gold medal – first place	2019 Lima	Team
Parapan American Zonal Championships
Gold medal – first place	2009 Denver, Colorado	Team
Gold medal – first place	2010 Denver, Colorado	Team
Gold medal – first place	2011 Sao Paulo, Brazil	Team
Gold medal – first place	2013 Edmond, Oklahoma	Team
Gold medal – first place	2017 Montreal, Canada	Team
Gold medal – first place	2019 Lima, Peru	Team
Sitting Volleyball Invitational
Silver medal – second place	2007 Shanghai, China	Team
Euro Cup
Gold medal – first place	2009 Roermond, Netherlands	Team
ECVD Continental Cup
Gold medal – first place	2011 Yevpatoria, Ukraine	Team
Volleyball Masters
Gold medal – first place	2012 Leersum, Netherlands	Team
Moscow Open Cup
Gold medal – first place	2013 Moscow, Russia	Team
Intercontinental Cup
Gold medal – first place	2016 Anji, China	Team
World Super 6
Gold medal – first place	2019 Tokyo, Japan	Team

Nichole Millage Faust (born March 27, 1977) is a former American Paralympic volleyballist (she retired in 2021 after the Tokyo Paralympics) and an Environmental Sustainability Specialist at the City of Champaign.

== Early life ==
Millage was born in Champaign, Illinois in 1977. In 1995, she graduated from Champaign Centennial High School. She played volleyball (middle hitter) and fast pitch softball (pitcher) throughout high school. In 2009, she earned a business degree from the University of Central Oklahoma. In 2012, she earned her master's degree in Business Administration from the University of Central Oklahoma. Before joining the sitting volleyball team, she worked as a legal secretary at Fischer & Wozniak, P.C. in Urbana, Illinois. She lost her left leg below the knee at the age of 21 in a boating accident at Clinton Lake in Clinton, Illinois. She also sustained injuries to her left hand.

== Career ==
She joined the U.S.A. National Sitting Volleyball team in March 2005. In 2006, she competed in the World Championships for sitting volleyball in Roermond, Netherlands, where her team placed 5th. In 2007, she competed in the Sitting Volleyball Invitational in Shanghai, China where Team USA won silver. In 2008, she participated in the World Organization Volleyball for Disabled in Ismailia, Egypt where her team won a bronze medal and the same year won a silver medal for her participation in the 2008 Paralympic Games in Beijing, China. In 2009, Millage won a gold medal in the Parapan American Zonal Championships which was held in Colorado and the same year won a gold medal at the Eurocup in Roermond, Netherlands.

Millage won a gold medal in 2010 the Parapan American Championships in Denver, Colorado and the same year won a gold medal at the WOVD Championships in Port Said, Egypt. Then in July 2010, Team USA won a silver medal at the World Championships which took place in Edmond, Oklahoma. In 2011 and 2012, respectively, she won three gold medals at the ECVD Continental Cup in Yevpatoria, Ukraine; Parapan American Zonal Championship in São Paulo, Brazil; and Sitting Volleyball Masters Tournament in Leersum, Netherlands. She also earned a silver medal for her participation in the 2012 Paralympic Games in London.

In 2013, Millage, along with Team USA, won the gold medal at both the Moscow Open Cup in August and the ParaVolley PanAmerican Zone Championships held in Edmond, Oklahoma in October. Team USA competed at the World Championships in Elblag, Poland in June 2014. Millage and Team USA won silver and had their closest finish ever against China in an international tournament, 23–25, 25–22, 19–25, 25–21, 17–15.

She was part of the USA team which won the gold at 2015 Parapan American Games in Toronto, Canada.; gold in the Intercontinental Cup in Anji, China in March 2016; gold at the 2016 Paralympic Games in Rio de Janeiro, Brazil; gold at the ParaVolley PanAmerican Zonal Championships in Montreal, Canada; silver at World Championship in Arnhem, Netherlands; gold at 2019 Parapan American Games in Lima, Peru; and gold at World Super 6 in Tokyo, Japan. She topped off her 16 1/2 year sitting volleyball career with a gold medal at the 2020 Paralympic Games in Tokyo.

== Personal life ==
Since 2013, Millage has worked at the City of Champaign as an Environmental Sustainability Specialist. She manages the city's recycling programs. On June 21, 2025, she married her husband, Ryan Faust.
