= Monique Burkland =

American Paralympic volleyball player (born 1989)

Monique Matthews

Personal information
- Full name: Monique Marie Burkland; Monique Marie Matthews
- Nationality: American
- Born: August 11, 1989 (age 37); Reno, Nevada, U.S
- Hometown: Ardmore, Oklahoma, U.S.
- Height: 6 ft 0 in (183 cm)
Medal record
Women's sitting volleyball
Representing United States
Paralympic Games
| Gold medal – first place | 2016 Rio de Janeiro | Team |
| Gold medal – first place | 2020 Tokyo | Team |
| Gold medal – first place | 2024 Paris | Team |
| Silver medal – second place | 2012 London | Team |
World Championships
| Silver medal – second place | 2010 Edmond, Oklahoma | Team |
Parapan American Games
| Gold medal – first place | 2015 Toronto | Team |
| Gold medal – first place | 2019 Lima | Team |
Parapan American Zonal Championship
| Gold medal – first place | 2011 São Paulo, Brazil | Team |
ECVD Continental Cup
| Gold medal – first place | 2011 Yevpatoria, Ukraine | Team |
Volleyball Masters
| Gold medal – first place | 2012 Leersum, Netherlands | Team |

Monique Marie Matthews (née Burkland, born August 11, 1989) is an American Paralympic volleyballist.

== Early life ==
Burkland was born in Reno, Nevada. She graduated from Plainview High School in 2008 where she used to be all-state softball player. There, she also did track and basketball. While being employed on a summer job, she lost her leg in a forklift accident. Since then, she has joined the USA sitting volleyball team and trains at the University of Central Oklahoma. On May 2, 2016, she married her boyfriend of almost five years Landon Matthews in Oklahoma City.

== Career ==
She started competing for Paralympic Games in 2010 where she won a silver medal for her participation at World Organization Volleyball for Disabled. In 2011 and 2012 respectively she won three gold medals at ECVD Continental Cup which was held in Yevpatoria, Ukraine, Parapan American Zonal Championship of São Paulo, Brazil and Volleyball Masters. She won a silver medal at the 2012 Paralympic Games in London.

She was a member of the USA Paralympic women's volleyball team which won the gold medal at the 2015 Parapan American Games in Toronto, at the 2016 Summer Paralympics in Rio de Janeiro, and at the 2020 Summer Paralympics in Tokyo.
