= Katie Holloway Bridge =

American sitting volleyball player

Kathryn Holloway

Personal information
- Full name: Kathryn Sue Holloway Bridge
- Born: June 8, 1986 (age 40); Everett, Washington, U.S.
- Hometown: Lake Stevens, Washington, U.S.
- Height: 6 ft 3 in (191 cm)
Medal record
Women's sitting volleyball
Representing United States
Paralympic Games
| Silver medal – second place | 2008 Beijing | Team |
| Silver medal – second place | 2012 London | Team |
| Gold medal – first place | 2016 Rio de Janeiro | Team |
| Gold medal – first place | 2020 Tokyo | Team |
| Gold medal – first place | 2024 Paris | Team |
World Championships
| Silver medal – second place | 2010 Edmond | Team |
| Silver medal – second place | 2014 Elbląg | Team |
WOVD Intercontinental Cup
| Bronze medal – third place | 2008 Ismailia | Team |
WOVD World Cup
| Gold medal – first place | 2010 Port Said | Team |
Parapan American Games
| Gold medal – first place | 2015 Toronto | Team |
| Gold medal – first place | 2019 Lima | Team |
Parapan American Zonal Championship
| Gold medal – first place | 2009 Denver | Team |
| Gold medal – first place | 2011 São Paulo | Team |
Parapan American Championship
| Gold medal – first place | 2010 Denver | Team |
Sitting Volleyball Invitational
| Silver medal – second place | 2007 Shanghai | Team |
Euro Cup
| Gold medal – first place | 2009 Roermond | Team |
ECVD Continental Cup
| Gold medal – first place | 2011 Yevpatoria | Team |
Volleyball Masters
| Gold medal – first place | 2012 Leersum | Team |

Kathryn Sue Holloway Bridge (born June 8, 1986) is an American Paralympic volleyballist.

== Early life ==
Holloway was born in Everett, Washington, without a fibula in her right leg; because of this, her right foot and ankle needed to be amputated when she was 20 months old. In 2004, she graduated from Lake Stevens High School. During her high school years from 2000 to 2002 she competed in volleyball and from the same year till 2004 in basketball. In her spare time she enjoys scrapbooking and watching Friends.

== Career ==
Following the loss, Holloway continued with her career and achieved professional results. Early in her career in sports, her skill was seen. By the time she graduated from Lake Stevens High School she had been recognized in both volleyball and basketball. Playing volleyball for two years and basketball all four. In 2002 and 2003 her basketball team went to the state championship, and it was then when she began being recruited by college basketball teams from all over the country. And when her team won the district championship things only got better for the young Holloway.

Even knowing she had a prosthetic leg, offers still poured in. Once she graduated from Lake Stevens High, she went on to California State at Northridge, in southern California, where she majored in Sociology. While she attended she played for the Matadors in NCAA Division 1 basketball till 2008. During her time there she won awards which include, Big West Women of the year, and her freshmen year was put on the Big West freshmen team. In her senior year at Northridge she was averaging about 14.5 points and 7 rebounds during a game. It seemed nothing could hold this young star back from achieving her dreams.

Her sister Chelsey Holloway also played Basketball in high school and later at Seattle University for the Red Hawks. The two sisters seem to share a common bond. Later in an interview with the Women’s Sports Foundation, Holloway was posed with a question: “Who is your hero?” She was quoted replying “My sister. She inspires me every day to be happy.” During her time in college not only did she compete with her college team but she was striving for more. Holloway also competed in several Sitting Volleyball tournaments. Sitting Volleyball is basically the same in every way to traditional volleyball, except for the fact that it is played like the name infers, while sitting. ("Sitting volleyball rules," 2012) In the rules it says all players must have one buttocks of the floor while making contact with the ball in play. There are no guidelines as to what type of ailment makes you eligible to play in this new form of the sport. Amputees, spinal cord injuries, cerebral palsy, brain injuries and strokes are just some of the conditions these players live with. All of whom are athletes by every definition of the word.

Starting in 2006, Holloway competed in the Sitting Volleyball Championship in Roermond, the Netherlands placing in fifth. Every year following she competed and won several medals in the sport. In 2007, she won a silver medal, in the Sitting Volleyball Invitational which took place in Shanghai, China. The next year winning another medal, this time bronze, in a Sitting Volleyball tournament in Egypt. The next year Holloway decided to compete in two sports, she played basketball for the Matadors and the same year competed in the Paralympics in Beijing, China. In basketball she was named Second Team All Big West Conference, which was only over shadowed by her win at the Paralympics. Holloway and her team won silver in the US Women’s Sitting Volleyball in China that year. She would go on to win several more medals for Sitting Volleyball.

In 2009, she won a gold medal in the Euro-Cup, and would also be named Best Blocker in the games. She continued on her winning streak by winning a silver medal, U.S. Women’s Sitting Volleyball Team at the Sitting Volleyball Championship in Edmond, Oklahoma, the first medal she won on US soil. After taking a year off she returned to the sport with new ambition. After rigorous strength training and with the help of family and friends Holloway returned to the Paralympics. In 2012 Holloway and her teammates walked away with the silver medal for the U.S. Women’s Sitting Volleyball Team in London that year. They were beaten by the Republic of China for the gold.

Team USA competed at the World Championships in Elbląg, Poland in June 2014. Holloway, as part of Team USA, have scored 24 points with 23 kills and 62 attacks. Therefore, she and her team won silver and had their closest finish ever against China in an international tournament, 23–25, 25–22, 19–25, 25–21, 17–15.

Holloway was a member of the USA Paralympic women's volleyball team which won the gold medal at the 2015 Parapan American Games in Toronto, at the 2016 Summer Paralympics in Rio de Janeiro, and at the 2020 Summer Paralympics in Tokyo.
