= Nicky Nieves =

American sitting volleyball player (born 1989)

Personal information
- Born: October 6, 1989 (age 36) The Bronx, New York City, New York, U.S
- Height: 5 ft 10 in (178 cm)

Sport
- Sport: Sitting volleyball
Medal record
Women's sitting volleyball
Representing the United States
Paralympic Games
Gold medal – first place	2016 Rio de Janeiro	Team
Gold medal – first place	2024 Paris	Team
World Championship
Silver medal – second place	2014 Elblag	Team
Silver medal – second place	2018 Arnhem	Team
Bronze medal – third place	2022 Sarajevo	Team
Parapan American Games
Gold medal – first place	2015 Toronto	Team
Gold medal – first place	2019 Lima	Team

Nicole Nieves (born October 6, 1989) is an American sitting volleyball player. She is a member of the United States women's national sitting volleyball team, with whom she won two gold medals at Parapan American Games, gold at the Summer Paralympics, and three medals at the World Para Volleyball Championships.

== Early life and education ==
Nicole Nieves was in New York City borough of the Bronx, on October 6, 1989, having no left hand since birth. She attended the Queens College, City University of New York where studied speech pathology.

== Career ==
Nieves competed at the World Para Volleyball Championship for the first time in June 2014, at which she and Kaleo Kanahele Maclay each scored 7 points in a match against China. The Team USA scored 23-25, 25-22, 19-25, 25-21, 17-15 as overall victory. Her team would also win silver in the tournament, which was her first. She was also called up to the 2018 World Championship and won her second silver medal in 2018. She again competed at the World Championship in 2022, where she won a bronze medal.

Nieves also represented the United States at the Parapan American Games, first in the 2015 edition and won a gold medal. She again represented the United States at the 2019 Parapan American Games and won a gold medal.

Nieves represented the United States at the 2016 Summer Paralympics in sitting volleyball and won a gold medal. On July 10, 2024, after an eight year absence, she was named to Team USA's roster to compete at the 2024 Summer Paralympics. Along with wheelchair basketball player Steve Serio, she served as one of two flag bearers for Team USA at the 2024 Summer Paralympics opening ceremony.
