= Katelyn Wright =

Canadian sitting volleyball player (born 1990)

Personal information
- Full name: Katelyn Audrey Wright
- Born: January 3, 1990 (age 36) Edmonton, Alberta, Canada

Sport
- Sport: Sitting volleyball
- Disability class: VS1
Medal record
Women's sitting volleyball
Representing Canada
Paralympic Games
Bronze medal – third place	2024 Paris	Team
Parapan American Games
Bronze medal – third place	2015 Toronto	Team
Bronze medal – third place	2019 Lima	Team

Katelyn Audrey Wright (born January 3, 1990) is a Canadian sitting volleyball player.

== Career ==
On July 22, 2024, she was named to Canada's roster to compete at the 2024 Summer Paralympics. She won a bronze medal in sitting volleyball, Canada's first ever medal in the event.

== Personal life ==
Wright was born with Klippel–Trénaunay syndrome in her right leg which resulted in poor circulation. In March 2013, after a series of major infections and loss of tissue in her leg, the decision was made to amputate her right leg above the knee.
