= Sitting volleyball at the 2015 Parapan American Games =

- Venue: Toronto Pan Am Sports Centre
- Dates: 8–14 August 2015
- Competitors: 117 from 7 nations

Sitting volleyball at the 2015 Parapan American Games was played from 8–14 August 2015 at the Toronto Pan Am Sports Centre.

== Participating nations ==
- Brazil (12 men & 12 women)
- Canada (11 men & 10 women)
- Colombia (12 men)
- Costa Rica (12 men)
- Cuba (12 women)
- Mexico (12 men)
- United States (12 men & 12 women)

== Team rosters ==
=== Men ===
Brazil; Vagner Batista Da Silva; Guilherme Borrajo; Wescley Conceicao; Fabricio Da Silva Pinto; Renato De Oliveira; Levi Gomes; Wellington Platini Silva; Diogo Reboucas; Anderson Ribas Da Silva; Daniel Silva; Giba Silva; Fred Souza	Canada; Jamoi Anderson; Jesse G. Buckingham; Ray Gauthier; Austin Hinchey; Doug Learoyd; Dave Marchand; Larry Matthews; Jason Naval; José Rebelo; Andrew Tucker; Jesse Ward	Colombia; John Báez Zambrano; Brayan Castro Cano; Fabio Caviedes Niño; Jhonatan Fuentes Holguín; Víctor Leal; Yesit Palacios Bejarano; Fabian Rios Uribe; Francisco Sabala Rondón; Edgar Sandoval Rivera; Carlos Valencia Rojas; Yair Yepes Trujillo; Víctor Zapata Betancurt
Costa Rica; José Badilla Ramírez; Carlos Castro Carvajal; Luis Chan Jimenez; Alexander Fernandez Vargas; Gerardo González Cerdas; Henry Quiros Morales; Leyner Ramirez Alfaro; Raúl Rivera Zamora; Jonatan Rodriguez; Eladio Rojas Arias; Emmanuel Rojas Betancourt; Edwar Solis Morera	Mexico; Etni Arizaga; Fernando Avalos; Rodrigo Campos; Froylan Castillo; Jose Diaz; Eathan Franco; Fidel Fuentes; Jose Lara; Julio Lopez; Antonio Pacheco; Alejandro Renteria; Jesus Sanchez	United States; Stephen Bracken; Eric Duda; Roderick Green; John Kremer; Edgardo LaForest Betancourt; J. Dee Marinko; Daniel Regan; Travis Ricks; Jese Schag; Hugo Storer; James Stuck; Charles Swearingen

=== Women ===
Brazil; Paula Angeloti Herts; Gizele Da Costa Dias; Nurya De Almeida Silva; Suellen Dellangelica Lima; Duda Dias; Jani Freitas Batista; Adria Jesus Da Silva; Gilvania Jose De Lima; Janaina Petit; Laiana Rodrigues Batista; Andressa Santos; Nathi Silva	Canada; Chantal Beauchesne; Angelena Dolezar; Anne Fergusson; Shacarra Orr; Heidi Peters; Tessa Popoff; Felicia Shafiq; Amber Skyrpan; Jolan Wong; Katelyn Wright
Cuba; Gladis Acosta; Haila Alonso Ferrer; Rachel Cunat; Nayda Dominguez; Flor Estrada; Mirlena Kindelan; Yadimi La O Zulema Orama; Ivel Rosabal; Marbeli Sanchez; Maydelin Soriano; Miriela Villarpando	United States; Courtney Baker; Monique Burkland; Angela Dehaan; Tia Edwards; Heather Erickson; Kathryn Holloway; Kaleo Kanahele; Nichole Millage; Kari Miller; Nicole Nieves; Alexis Shifflett; Bethany Zummo

== Medal summary ==
=== Medal table ===
Source: Toronto2015.org

Rank	Nation	Gold	Silver	Bronze	Total
1	Brazil	1	1	0	2
1	United States	1	1	0	2
3	Canada	0	0	2	2
Totals (3 entries)		2	2	2	6

=== Medal events ===
Event	Gold	Silver	Bronze
Men's	Brazil (BRA); Vagner Batista Da Silva; Guilherme Borrajo; Wescley Conceicao; Fabricio Da Silva Pinto; Renato De Oliveira; Levi Gomes; Wellington Platini Silva; Diogo Reboucas; Anderson Ribas Da Silva; Daniel Silva; Giba Silva; Fred Souza	United States (USA); Stephen Bracken; Eric Duda; Roderick Green; John Kremer; Edgardo LaForest Betancourt; J. Dee Marinko; Daniel Regan; Travis Ricks; Jese Schag; Hugo Storer; James Stuck; Charles Swearingen	Canada (CAN); Jamoi Anderson; Jesse Buckingham; Ray Gauthier; Austin Hinchey; Doug Learoyd; Dave Marchand; Larry Matthews; Jason Naval; José Rebelo; Andrew Tucker; Jesse Ward
Women's	United States (USA); Courtney Baker; Monique Burkland; Angela Dehaan; Tia Edwards; Heather Erickson; Kathryn Holloway; Kaleo Kanahele; Nichole Millage; Kari Miller; Nicole Nieves; Alexis Shifflett; Bethany Zummo	Brazil (BRA); Paula Angeloti Herts; Gizele Da Costa Dias; Nurya De Almeida Silva; Suellen Dellangelica Lima; Duda Dias; Jani Freitas Batista; Adria Jesus Da Silva; Gilvania Jose De Lima; Janaina Petit; Laiana Rodrigues Batista; Andressa Santos; Nathi Silva	Canada (CAN); Chantal Beauchesne; Angelena Dolezar; Anne Fergusson; Shacarra Orr; Heidi Peters; Tessa Popoff; Felicia Shafiq; Amber Skyrpan; Jolan Wong; Katelyn Wright
