= Sitting volleyball at the 2019 Parapan American Games =

- Venue: Villa El Salvador Sports Center, Lima
- Dates: 23–28 August
- Competitors: 120 from 6 nations

Sitting volleyball will be played at the 2019 Parapan American Games. The winner of each tournament will be automatically qualified to participate in the 2020 Summer Paralympics.

== Medalists ==
Event	Gold	Silver	Bronze
Men's tournament	Brazil (BRA)	United States (USA)	Canada (CAN)
Women's tournament	United States (USA)	Brazil (BRA)	Canada (CAN)

== Teams' roster ==
Men

United States; Dan Regan; Nicholas Dadgostar; Eric Duda; Stephen Bracken; James Stuck; Roderick Green; Patrick Young; Charlie Swearingen; John Kremer; Chris Seilkop; Zach Upp; J Dee Marinko	Canada; Doug Learoyd; Chris Bird; Matteo Lisoway; Jesse Buckingham; Austin Hinchey; Jesse Ward; Bryce Foster; Mikael Bartholdy; Jamoi Anderson; Darek Symonowicz; Brad Hunter	Peru; Felix Miranda; Miguel Fernandez; Mario Vasquez; Faustino Cuadros; Juan Lazarte; Marco Huaytalla; Ivan Torres; Victor Arias; Segundo Ramos; Jhon Cordova; Roger Olivera; Bruno Quiros
Brazil; Anderson Dos Santos; Daniel Da Silva; Daniel Yoshizawa; Diogo Rebouças; Fabrício Da Silva Pinto; Gilberto Da Silva; Leandro Da Silva Santos; Leandro Araujo da Silva; Renato De Oliveira; Samuel Arantes; Wellington Silva Da Anunciação; Wescley De Oliveira	Colombia; Carlos Valencia; Edgar Sandoval; Victor Leal; Mauricio Guzman; Jhonatan Fuentes; Fabian Rios; Fabio Caviedes; John Baez; Francisco Sabala; Yessi Mosquera; Edward Guerrero; Luis Lozano	Costa Rica; Carlos Castro; Eladio Rojas; Yadir Fernandez; Alexander Fernandez; Luis Quiros; Mauricio Gomez; Edgar Solano; Henry Quiros; Mario Rodriguez; Ronald Gonzalez; Edwar Solis; Edgar Gonzalez

Women

Canada; Danielle Ellis; Heidi Peters; Sarah Melenka; Julie Kozun; Anne Fergusson; Jolan Wong; Felicia Voss-Shafiq; Katelyn Wright; Jennifer Oakes; Angelena Dolezar; Amber Skyrpan; Payden Olsen	United States; Lora Webster; Bethany Zummo; Lexi Shifflett; Katie Holloway; Heather Erickson; Monique Burkland; Sydney Satchell; Jillian Williams; Nichole Millage; Kaleo Kanahele Maclay; Nicole Nieves; Tia Edwards	Peru; Edith Anccasi; Kelly Ari; Yovani Castillo; Rosario Chavez; Rosa Espinoza; Rocio Patino; Maria Peralta; Filomena Ramos; Diana Rojas; Luz Claribel Santa Cruz; Yaneth Sarmiento; Zoila Zuniga	Brazil; Ádria Jesus Da Silva; Camila De Castro; Eduarda De Oliveira; Gabrielle Aparecida Marchi; Géssica De Araujo; Gizele Da Costa Dias; Jani Freitas Batista; Laiana Rodrigues Batista; Nathalie De Lima Silva; Nurya Silva; Pâmela Pereira; Vanessa Seracinskis

== Men's tournament ==
There are six nations participating in the men's tournament.

23 August 2019; 8:00	Costa Rica (CRC)	0 - 3	Colombia (COL)	Villa El Salvador Sports Center
23 August 2019; 8:00	(12-25) (20-25) (14-25)			Villa El Salvador Sports Center

23 August 2019; 10:00	Peru (PER)	0 - 3	Brazil (BRA)	Villa El Salvador Sports Center
23 August 2019; 10:00	(2-25) (7-25) (5-25)			Villa El Salvador Sports Center

24 August 2019; 8:00	Canada (CAN)	3 - 2	Colombia (COL)	Villa El Salvador Sports Center
24 August 2019; 8:00	(23-25) (25-15) (23-25) (25-20) (15-6)			Villa El Salvador Sports Center

24 August 2019; 10:00	Peru (PER)	0 - 3	United States (USA)	Villa El Salvador Sports Center
24 August 2019; 10:00	(4-25) (4-25) (16-25)			Villa El Salvador Sports Center

24 August 2019; 12:00	Brazil (BRA)	3 - 0	Costa Rica (CRC)	Villa El Salvador Sports Center
24 August 2019; 12:00	(25-7) (25-9) (25-11)			Villa El Salvador Sports Center

24 August 2019; 15:00	Canada (CAN)	3 - 0	Peru (PER)	Villa El Salvador Sports Center
24 August 2019; 15:00	(25-16) (25-8) (25-18)			Villa El Salvador Sports Center

24 August 2019; 21:00	Brazil (BRA)	3 - 1	United States (USA)	Villa El Salvador Sports Center
24 August 2019; 21:00	(14-25) (25-17) (25-20) (25-20)			Villa El Salvador Sports Center

25 August 2019; 9:00	Costa Rica (CRC)	0 - 3	Canada (CAN)	Villa El Salvador Sports Center
25 August 2019; 9:00	(10-25) (16-25) (13-25)			Villa El Salvador Sports Center

25 August 2019; 11:00	United States (USA)	3 - 0	Colombia (COL)	Villa El Salvador Sports Center
25 August 2019; 11:00	(25-19) (25-18) (25-18)			Villa El Salvador Sports Center

25 August 2019; 19:00	Costa Rica (CRC)	0 - 3	United States (USA)	Villa El Salvador Sports Center
25 August 2019; 19:00	(13-25) (9-25) (15-25)			Villa El Salvador Sports Center

25 August 2019; 21:00	Brazil (BRA)	3 - 1	Canada (CAN)	Villa El Salvador Sports Center
25 August 2019; 21:00	(25-27) (26-24) (25-23) (25-11)			Villa El Salvador Sports Center

26 August 2019; 9:00	Colombia (COL)	3 - 0	Peru (PER)	Villa El Salvador Sports Center
26 August 2019; 9:00	(25-14) (25-8) (25-18)			Villa El Salvador Sports Center

26 August 2019; 17:00	United States (USA)	3 - 0	Canada (CAN)	Villa El Salvador Sports Center
26 August 2019; 17:00	(25-22) (25-20) (27-25)			Villa El Salvador Sports Center

26 August 2019; 19:00	Costa Rica (CRC)	3 - 0	Peru (PER)	Villa El Salvador Sports Center
26 August 2019; 19:00	(25-11) (25-22) (25-21)			Villa El Salvador Sports Center

26 August 2019; 21:00	Brazil (BRA)	3 - 0	Colombia (COL)	Villa El Salvador Sports Center
26 August 2019; 21:00	(25-18) (25-19) (25-12)			Villa El Salvador Sports Center

5/6th classification match

27 August 2019; 9:00	Costa Rica	3 - 0	Peru	Villa El Salvador Sports Center
27 August 2019; 9:00	(30-28) (25-20) (25-11)			Villa El Salvador Sports Center

Semifinals

27 August 2019; 11:00	United States	3 - 0	Canada	Villa El Salvador Sports Center
27 August 2019; 11:00	(25-20) (25-16) (25-23)			Villa El Salvador Sports Center

27 August 2019; 15:00	Brazil	3 - 0	Colombia	Villa El Salvador Sports Center
27 August 2019; 15:00	(25-6) (25-21) (25-12)			Villa El Salvador Sports Center

Bronze medal match

28 August 2019; 15:00	Canada	3 - 0	Colombia	Villa El Salvador Sports Center
28 August 2019; 15:00	(25-19) (25-21) (25-17)			Villa El Salvador Sports Center

Gold medal match

28 August 2019; 17:00	United States	0 - 3	Brazil	Villa El Salvador Sports Center
28 August 2019; 17:00	(18-25) (22-25) (12-25)			Villa El Salvador Sports Center

== Women's tournament ==
There are four nations participating in the women's tournament.

24 August 2019; 17:00	Canada (CAN)	1 - 3	Brazil (BRA)	Villa El Salvador Sports Center
24 August 2019; 17:00	(25-23) (25-22) (26-28) (18-25)			Villa El Salvador Sports Center

24 August 2019; 19:00	Peru (PER)	0 - 3	United States (USA)	Villa El Salvador Sports Center
24 August 2019; 19:00	(6-25) (3-25) (10-25)			Villa El Salvador Sports Center

25 August 2019; 15:00	United States (USA)	3 - 1	Brazil (BRA)	Villa El Salvador Sports Center
25 August 2019; 15:00	(25-12) (25-18) (22-25) (25-21)			Villa El Salvador Sports Center

25 August 2019; 17:00	Peru (PER)	0 - 3	Canada (CAN)	Villa El Salvador Sports Center
25 August 2019; 17:00	(6-25) (21-25) (9-25)			Villa El Salvador Sports Center

26 August 2019; 11:00	United States (USA)	3 - 0	Canada (CAN)	Villa El Salvador Sports Center
26 August 2019; 11:00	(25-14) (25-17) (25-12)			Villa El Salvador Sports Center

26 August 2019; 13:00	Peru (PER)	0 - 3	Brazil (BRA)	Villa El Salvador Sports Center
26 August 2019; 13:00	(12-25) (10-25) (13-25)			Villa El Salvador Sports Center

Semifinals

27 August 2019; 17:00	Brazil	3 - 0	Canada	Villa El Salvador Sports Center
27 August 2019; 17:00	(25-11) (25-16) (25-21)			Villa El Salvador Sports Center

27 August 2019; 19:00	United States	3 - 0	Peru	Villa El Salvador Sports Center
27 August 2019; 19:00	(25-3) (25-4) (25-12)			Villa El Salvador Sports Center

Bronze medal match

28 August 2019; 19:00	Canada	3 - 0	Peru	Villa El Salvador Sports Center
28 August 2019; 19:00	(25-7) (25-14) (25-14)			Villa El Salvador Sports Center

Gold medal match

28 August 2019; 21:00	Brazil	0 - 3	United States	Villa El Salvador Sports Center
28 August 2019; 21:00	(16-25) (19-25) (13-25)			Villa El Salvador Sports Center

== See also ==
- Volleyball at the 2019 Pan American Games
- Volleyball at the 2020 Summer Paralympics
