= Kari Miller =

American Paralympic volleyballer

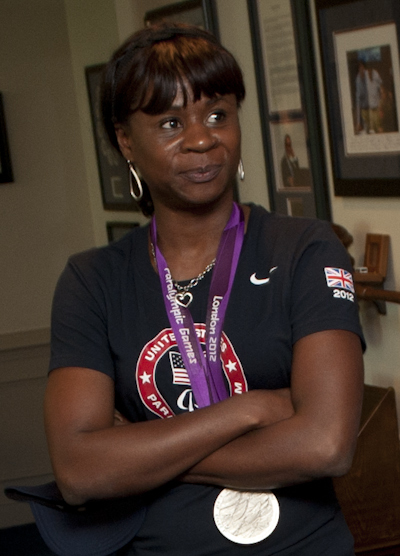
- Miller in 2012

Personal information
- Full name: Kari LaRaine Miller
- Born: April 16, 1977 (age 49); Newark, New Jersey, U.S.
- Hometown: Washington, D.C., U.S.
- Height: 5 ft 6 in (168 cm)
Honors
Women's sitting volleyball
Representing United States
Paralympic Games
Silver medal – second place	2008 Beijing	Team
Silver medal – second place	2012 London	Team
Gold medal – first place	2016 Rio	Team
World Championships
Silver medal – second place	2010 Edmond, Oklahoma	Team
WOVD Intercontinental Cup
Bronze medal – third place	2008 Ismailia, Egypt	Team
Parapan American Games
Gold medal – first place	2015 Toronto, Canada	Team
Parapan American Zonal Championships
Gold medal – first place	2009 Denver, Colorado	Team
Gold medal – first place	2011 Sao Paulo, Brazil	Team
Sitting Volleyball Invitational
Silver medal – second place	2007 Shanghai, China	Team
Euro Cup
Gold medal – first place	2009 Roermond, Netherlands	Team
ECVD Continental Cup
Gold medal – first place	2011 Yevpatoria, Ukraine	Team
Volleyball Masters
Gold medal – first place	2012 Leersum, Netherlands	Team

Kari LaRaine Miller (born April 16, 1977) is an American Paralympic volleyball player.

== Early life ==
Miller was born in Newark, New Jersey. In 1995 she graduated from Cardozo Senior High in Washington, D.C. and in 2011 began attending University of Central Oklahoma. In her spare time she likes to watch Heroes and when it comes to sports her favorite team is Minnesota Vikings. She also likes Adrian Peterson and is into equestrianism, jet skiing, parachuting, and rock climbing.

== Career ==
Miller lost both her legs when a car she was in was hit by a drunk driver while she was on leave from military duty in 1999. She started competing for Paralympic Games in 2007 where she won a silver medal for her participation at Sitting Volleyball Invitational. In 2008, she participated at World Organization Volleyball for Disabled where she won bronze medal and the same year got another silver one for her participation at 2008 Paralympic Games in Beijing, China. In 2009, Miller was awarded as Paralympian of the year. In 2010, she won silver medal at Parapan American Championship which was held in Colorado and the same year got gold medal for another WOVD Championship. In 2011 and 2012 respectively she won three gold medals at ECVD Continental Cup, Parapan American Zonal Championship, and Volleyball Masters. She also got 4th silver medal for her participation at 2012 Paralympic Games in London.

She was part of the USA team which won the gold at 2015 Parapan American Games in Toronto, Canada.

Miller provided commentary for NBC during the 2021 Tokyo Paralympics.
