= Chantal Beauchesne =

Canadian sitting volleyball player

Personal information
- Born: January 29, 1984 (age 42) St. Isidore, Ontario, Canada

Sport
- Country: Canada
- Sport: Sitting volleyball
- Retired: 2016
Medal record
Sitting volleyball
Representing Canada
Parapan American Games
| Bronze medal – third place | 2011 Guadalajara | Women's tournament |
| Bronze medal – third place | 2015 Toronto | Women's tournament |

Chantal Beauchesne (born January 29, 1984) is a Canadian retired sitting volleyball player who competed at international volleyball competitions. She is a two-time Parapan American Games bronze medalist and competed at the 2016 Summer Paralympics.

Beauchesne began sitting volleyball after recovering from a motorbike accident in 2009.
