= Danielle Ellis =

Canadian sitting volleyball player

Personal information
- Born: November 17, 1991 (age 34) White Rock, British Columbia, Canada

Sport
- Country: Canada
- Sport: Sitting volleyball
- Coached by: Nicole Ban
Medal record
Sitting volleyball
Representing Canada
Parapan American Games
| Bronze medal – third place | 2019 Lima | Women's tournament |

Danielle Ellis (born November 17, 1991) is a Canadian sitting volleyball player who competes in international volleyball competitions, she plays as captain. She is a Parapan American Games bronze medallist and has competed at the 2016 and 2020 Summer Paralympics. She has been a member of the Canadian national sitting volleyball team since 2009.

Ellis works as an ambulance dispatcher in Langley.
