= Bethany Zummo =

American sitting volleyball player (born 1993)

Personal information
- Full name: Bethany Paige Zummo
- Born: February 15, 1993 (age 33); Dublin, California, U.S.
- Hometown: Dublin, California, U.S.
- Height: 5 ft 3 in (160 cm)
- Education: Central Oaklahoma

Volleyball information
- Position: Libero
- Current team: USA Sitting Volleyball Women's
Medal record
Women's sitting volleyball
Representing United States
Paralympic Games
Gold medal – first place	2016 Rio	Team competition
Gold medal – first place	2020 Tokyo	Team competition
Gold medal – first place	2024 Paris	Team competition
Parapan American Games
Gold medal – first place	2015 Toronto	Team competition
Gold medal – first place	2019 Lima	Team competition

Bethany Paige Zummo (born February 15, 1993) is an American sitting volleyball player. She is a member of the United States women's national sitting volleyball team. She won with the team the gold medal at the 2016 Summer Paralympics. She also won with the team the 2015 Parapan American Games and 2019 Parapan American Games.

Zummo studied at Dublin High School. She played for University of Central Oklahoma. In 2020, she sewed masks and donated them.
