= VolleySLIDE =

- Sport: Sitting Volleyball
- Category: Disability Sports Education
- Abbreviation: Sitting Volleyball Education Programme for World ParaVolley
- Founded: 2012
- Affiliation: World ParaVolley
- Headquarters: Worldwide
- Other key staff: Matt Rogers

Official website
- www.volleyslide.net

VolleySLIDE is a Sitting Volleyball world educational programme by World ParaVolley, the international federation responsible for all forms of ParaVolley. World ParaVolley (formerly known as World Organisation Volleyball for Disabled (or WOVD) is a member of International Paralympic Committee.
