= Pieter Joon =

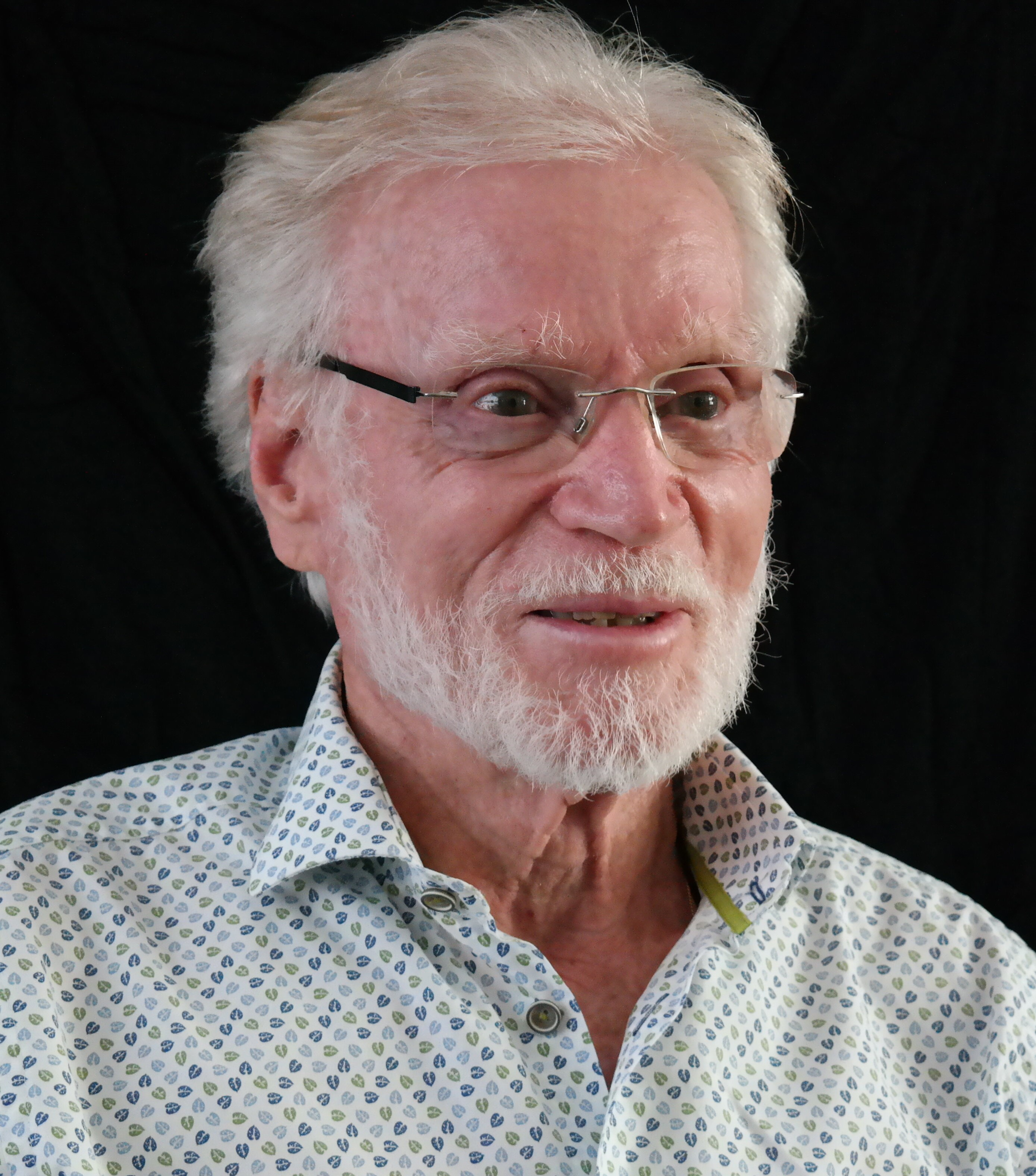
2022 Image of Pieter Joon

Pieter Christiaan Joon (born February 4, 1942, Amsterdam) founded the World Organization Volleyball for Disabled (WOVD) in 1980 in the Netherlands. He was the president of this organization from 1980 to 2001. The General Assembly of the WOVD, in a meeting on 27 October 2001 in Slovenia, decided to award him the title of Honorary President.

Joon has been a board member of several different international sports organisations for disabled people. From 1980 to 1989 he was a board member of the International Stoke Mandeville Games Federation (ISMGF). From 1981 to 1992 he was a board member of the International Sports Organisation for Disabled (ISOD). From 1981 to 1992 he was a member of the Technical Committee of the International Fund Sports Disabled. From 1984 to 1992 he was a member of the Technical Committee Paralympic Games. From 1990 to 1993 he was a member of the Comite Sports Disabled European Union. He has been involved in the competition programs in the Paralympics in: 1980 Arnhem (NED), 1984 New York (USA) and Stoke Mandeville (GBR), 1988 Seoul (KOR), 1992 Barcelona (ESP), 1996 Atlanta (USA) and 2000 Sydney (AUS).
