= Roderick Green (athlete) =

American Paralympic athlete (born 1979)

Personal information
- Born: Roderick Dal-Juan Green; March 16, 1979 (age 47) West Monroe, Louisiana, U.S.
- Education: Oklahoma Christian University ('02)
Medal record
Paralympic athletics
Representing United States
Paralympic Games
Silver medal – second place	2000 Sydney	200 metres – T44
Bronze medal – third place	2000 Sydney	400 metres – T44
Bronze medal – third place	2000 Sydney	Long Jump – F44

Roderick Green (born March 16, 1979) is a paralympic athlete from the United States competing mainly in category T44 sprint events.

Roderick has competed in two Paralympics, firstly in 2000 where he won a silver in the 200m and bronze in both the 400m and long jump but could not help the American T46 relay team to a medal. His second games were in 2004 where despite competing in the 100m long jump and shot put he was unable to add to his tally of medals.

When Green was born he had no right ankle or fibula; his leg was amputated below the knee at age two. In 1997, he graduated from West Monroe High School in West Monroe, Louisiana. He then attended Oklahoma Christian University where he played basketball and in 2002 earned his degree in physical education and nutrition.
