= World ParaVolley =

International volleyball organization that is for people with physical disabilities

- Formation: 1981 - 1994 (WOVD) - 2014 (World ParaVolley)
- Type: Sports federation
- Headquarters: Loughborough, England
- Members: 66 members
- Official language: English
- President: Juergen Schrapp
- Website: https://www.worldparavolley.org/

World ParaVolley, formerly the World Organization Volleyball for Disabled (WOVD), is an international organization that is for people with physical disabilities. It is affiliated with the International Paralympic Committee (IPC). The World Organization Volleyball for Disabled was established in 1981 and was part of the International Sports Organization for Disabled (ISOD). In 1992 the WOVD became its own separate Organization in Barcelona, Spain. The WOVD Headquarters were also established in the Netherlands.

The WOVD is responsible for managing and controlling the conduct of international volleyball competitions for men, women and youth. The WOVD also liaises with IPC (as an independent organisation) and with other organizations for people with or without disabilities. The organization adopted its present name World ParaVolley at its 2014 general assembly.

== History ==
As volleyball caught on and became a popular sport and the Olympics became increasingly popular, the paralympic games started coming into play. The first paralympic games were played in 1960 in Rome immediately after the Olympic Games. By 1976, amputees started participating in the paralympics. In 1967 the Dutch introduced a new game called sitting volleyball, which is a combination of sitzball and volleyball. Then in 1978 the ISOD accepted sitting volleyball in its programs. The first official tournament took place in 1979 in Haarlem, Netherlands, and then in 1980 sitting volleyball was accepted as a Paralympic sport with seven players. Since 1993, Sitting Volleyball championships have been organized for men and women. It has become one of the main team-sports in the Paralympic Programme. It is a fast, exciting and crowd pleasing sport, which can show the athletic skills of disabled sportsmen/women.

Standing Volleyball for the Disabled, was played by athletes with disabilities long before the international federation was founded. It has its roots in Great Britain and was originally played only by amputee players. To encourage the participation on those ones with a more severe amputation, a classification system has been set up and players on court must follow certain rules. Teams must respect these classification rules to ensure an equitable team composition. International competitions have taken place since the 1960s, although it was not until 1976 that volleyball was accepted into the Paralympic Games Programme, in Toronto, Ontario, Canada. Since 1980 volleyball has had a regular international calendar.

Barry Couzner (OAM) of Australia was the president from 2014 to 2023 - a period of 10 years during which many innovations and improvements were made to the organisation - these were recognised when Couzner was inducted into the International Volleynall Hall of Fame (USA) in 2025..

== Origin ==
The game of Volleyball was created by William G. Morgan, a YMCA physical education director, on February 9, 1895, in Holyoke, Massachusetts (USA). When Morgan first created the game of volleyball it was called Minonette. The first rules were written down by Morgan. The game of volleyball was not officially called volleyball until 1896 and was two separate words. As the years went on it later became one word, then a special ball was designed for volleyball in 1900. 64 years later in 1964 Men's and Women's volleyball were introduced as an Olympic sport. Later in 1884 the Men's team won its first Olympic medal and later men's beach volleyball was added as an Olympic sport in 1996.

== Members ==
66 Nations Member in 30 June 2023:

1. Europe (26): Bosnia & Herzegovina-Croatia-Czechia-Denmark-Estonia-Finland-France-Georgia-Germany-Great Britain-Hungary-Italy-Latvia-Lithuania-Malta-Montenegro-Netherlands-Norway-Poland-Serbia-Slovakia-Slovenia-Türkiye-Ukraine-Russia-Georgia
2. Asia-Pacific (17): Cambodia-China-I.R. Iran-India-Indonesia-Iraq-Japan-Kazakhstan-Korea-Malaysia-Mongolia-Myanmar-Saudi Arabia-Sri Lanka-Thailand-Vanuatu-Philippines
3. Americas (13): Argentina-Bolivia-Brazil-Canada-Colombia-Costa Rica-Ecuador-El Salvador-Mexico-Nicaragua-Peru-USA-Venezuela
4. Africa (10): Algeria-Egypt-Ghana-Morocco-Mozambique-Nigeria-RD Congo-Rwanda-South Africa-Zimbabwe

== Regions ==
1. Africa
2. Asia Pacific
3. Africa
4. Europe

== Types of volleyball ==
=== Sitting volleyball ===
Athletics and Sitzball - originating from Germany - were the main sports. Soon it was found that Sitzball, which is played sitting down on the floor, was too passive; more mobile forms of sports were looked for. With Sitting Volleyball, the disability of a player is no longer a handicap. Since players must be sitting on the floor when hitting the ball, only the skill is important, not the disability. This produces a very competitive sport.

In 1956, the Dutch Sports Committee introduced a new game called Sitting Volleyball, a combination of sitzball and volleyball. Since then Sitting Volleyball has grown into one of the biggest sports practised in competition not only by disabled people in the Netherlands, but also by interested "able-bodied" volleyball players with an injury of the ankle or knee.

Sitting Volleyball has the radiation to grow into a sport in which disabled people and non-disabled persons can play on a high technical level.

Sitting Volleyball is played with six players per team on a smaller volleyball court with lowered nets. This version enables double leg amputees and individuals with spinal injuries and various other disabilities to play volleyball. Besides a few rules regarding physical advantages, all nondisabled rules apply.

=== Standing volleyball ===
Standing volleyball which is the only team sport that can be played "standing" by people with physical disabilities. The Amputee athletes have a choice to play with or without prostheses. Depending on the sense of balance, some above the knee amputees will choose to play without a prosthesis hopping on a single leg. Standing volleyball is played on an integrated FIVB rules.

The game of Standing Volleyball decided to allow other disability groups to take part, therefore encouraging more nations to participate. Although this initially created more classification problems, the WOVD finally, after four years, established criteria for classification, which includes those players with various arm or leg disabilities.

=== Beach volleyball ===
Beach ParaVolley is a version of standing volleyball that is played on beach courts rather than indoor courts. It is played with three-member teams and works within the Paralympic classification system. Standard FIVB Beach Volleyball rules are followed. The sport is growing, with teams regularly competing in Asia and Oceania since 2007. As of 2018, World ParaVolley is working towards inclusion of Paralympic Beach Volleyball as a medal sport in the Los Angeles games in 2028.

Types:

28th edition of the AeQuilibrium Beach Volley Marathon: in six different categories: Women’s 2×2, Men’s 2×2, Mixed 2×2, Women’s 3×3, Men’s 3×3 and Mixed 4×4.

== European Federation ==
ParaVolley Europe (PVE) - ParaVolley EUROPE - Sitting & Standing Volleyball in Europe (Beach / Indoor)

=== Members ===
1 June 2024:

1. ASSOCIATION OF SITTING VOLLEYBALL OF BOSNIA & HERZEGOVINA
2. CROATIAN PARALYMPIC COMMITTEE - CROATIAN PARAVOLLEY FEDERATION
3. CZECH VOLLEYBALL FEDERATION
4. PARASPORT DANMARK
5. EESTI VÕRKPALLI LIIT
6. FINNISH VOLLEYBALL ASSOCIATION
7. FEDERATION FRANCAISE DE VOLLEY
8. GEORGIAN PARALYMPIC COMMITTEE
9. DEUTSCHER BEHIDERTENSPORVERBAND UND NATIONALES PARALYMPISCHES KOMITEE (DBS) e.V.
10. HELLENIC SPORT FEDERATION FOR PERSONS WITH DISABILITIES
11. HUNGARIAN VOLLEYBALL FEDERATION
12. FEDERAZIONE ITALIANA PALLAVOLO (FIPAV)
13. KOSOVO PARAVOLLEY FEDERATION
14. LATVIAN SITTING VOLLEYBALL ASSOCIATION FOR THE DISABLED PEOPLE
15. LITHUANIA SPORTS FEDERATION FOR THE DISABLED
16. PARAVOLLEY MALTA
17. CRNOGORSKI OLIMPIJSKI KOMITET
18. NEDERLANDSE VOLLEYBALBOND - DUTCH VOLLEYBALL FEDERATION (NEVOBO)
19. NORWEGIAN VOLLEYBALL FEDERATION
20. POLISH SPORTS ASSOCIATION FOR THE DISABLED START
21. RUSSIAN PARALYMPIC COMMITTEE
22. SERBIA SITTING VOLLEYBALL FEDERATION FOR DISABLED - NPC Serbia
23. SLOVAK SPORTS ASSOCIATION FOR THE DISABLED
24. SPORTS FEDERATION FOR THE DISABLED OF SLOVENIA - SLOVENIAN PARALYMPIC COMMITTEE
25. TURKIYE VOLLEYBALL FEDERATION
26. UKRAINE FEDERATION OF SPORTS FOR PERSONS WITH LOCOMOTOR DISABILITIES
27. BRITISH VOLLEYBALL FEDERATION

=== Results ===
1. Nations Leagues:
2. Club Competitions:
3. Sitting Volleyball European Championships:
4. European Championships Div. B & C:

=== Sitting Volleyball European Championships ===
==== Men (1981-2023) ====
Rank	Nation	Gold	Silver	Bronze	Total
1	Bosnia and Herzegovina	11	1	2	14
2	Netherlands	5	0	2	7
3	Russia	2	5	2	9
4	Norway	1	2	2	5
5	Finland	1	1	3	5
6	Hungary	1	1	1	3
7	Germany	0	8	6	14
8	Yugoslavia	0	2	0	2
9	Ukraine	0	1	1	2
10	Sweden	0	0	2	2
Totals (10 entries)		21	21	21	63

==== Women (1993-2023) ====
Rank	Nation	Gold	Silver	Bronze	Total
1	Netherlands	7	1	3	11
2	Russia	4	1	1	6
3	Ukraine	2	4	2	8
4	Slovenia	1	3	6	10
5	Italy	1	2	0	3
6	Latvia	1	1	0	2
7	Finland	0	2	2	4
8	Lithuania	0	2	0	2
9	Estonia	0	0	1	1
9	Germany	0	0	1	1
Totals (10 entries)		16	16	16	48

== Ranking ==
12 November 2025:

=== Men ===
37 Teams

Rank	Team	Points
1	Egypt	4714
2	Brazil	4297
3	Bosnia and Herzegovina	4150
4	Iran	4000
5	Kazakhstan	3872
6	United States	3379
7	Germany	3343
8	Canada	2628
9	Ukraine	2594
10	Croatia	2342

=== Women ===
28 Teams

Rank	Team	Points
1	United States	5165
2	Canada	4554
3	Brazil	4358
4	Italy	4108
5	Slovenia	3091
6	Germany	2938
7	China	2800
8	Rwanda	2784
9	Iran	2411
10	Ukraine	2386

== See also ==
- Volleyball at the Summer Paralympics
- World Para Volleyball Championship
- Sitting volleyball
- Bosnia and Herzegovina national sitting volleyball team
- Iran national sitting volleyball team
- Germany men's national sitting volleyball team
- European Para Volleyball Championship (Euro Zone)
- Asian Para Volleyball Championship (Asia Oceania Zone)
- African Para Volleyball Championship (Africa Zone )
- Pan American Para Volleyball Championship (America Zone)
- Euro League Club Championship
- VolleySLIDE
