= Sitting volleyball classification =

Disability sport classification system

Sitting volleyball classification is the classification system for sitting volleyball. Only people with lower leg paralysis or lower leg extremity amputations are eligible to compete. The sport is governed by World Paravolley formerly known as World Organization Volleyball for Disabled (WOVD).

== Definition ==
The 1998 USA Paralympic men's sitting volleyball team

Sitting volleyball allows for multiple classifications but players effectively play in one class, with eligibility for the sport limited to people with lower leg paralysis or lower leg extremity amputations. This sport has rules that were designed specifically for people with disabilities in mind. Classifications for this sport are based on functional mobility. In total there are three types of classification, whereby only two are eligible to play at international competitions. They are, Disabled (D class), Minimally Disabled (MD), and Abled-Bodied (AB), where the latter is ineligible to play.

== Governance ==
The sport's classification process is governed by the World Organization Volleyball for the Disabled.

== History ==
By the early 1990s, sitting volleyball classification had moved away from medical based system to a functional classification system. Because of issues in objectively identifying functionality that plagued the post Barcelona Games, the IPC unveiled plans to develop a new classification system in 2003. This classification system went into effect in 2007, and defined ten different disability types that were eligible to participate on the Paralympic level. It required that classification be sport specific, and served two roles. The first was that it determined eligibility to participate in the sport and that it created specific groups of sportspeople who were eligible to participate and in which class. The IPC left it up to International Federations to develop their own classification systems within this framework, with the specification that their classification systems use an evidence based approach developed through research.

== Eligibility ==
People with physical disabilities are eligible to compete in this sport. In competitions that are non-sanctioned, such as national cup and league matches, people without disabilities may compete.

== Process ==
At the 1996 Summer Paralympics, on the spot classification required that classifiers have access to medical equipment like Snellen charts, reflex hammers, and goniometers to properly classify competitors.

For Australian competitors in this sport, the sport is not supported by the Australian Paralympic Committee. There are three types of classification available for Australian competitors: Provisional, national and international. The first is for club level competitions, the second for state and national competitions, and the third for international competitions.

== At the Paralympic Games ==
At the 1992 Summer Paralympics, two types of volleyball were played including sitting and amputee, with classification being run through ISOD. At the 2000 Summer Paralympics, 26 assessments were conducted at the Games. This resulted in 1 class change.

For the 2016 Summer Paralympics in Rio, the International Paralympic Committee had a zero classification at the Games policy. This policy was put into place in 2014, with the goal of avoiding last minute changes in classes that would negatively impact athlete training preparations. All competitors needed to be internationally classified with their classification status confirmed prior to the Games, with exceptions to this policy being dealt with on a case-by-case basis. In case there was a need for classification or reclassification at the Games despite best efforts otherwise, sitting volleyball classification was scheduled for September 5 and September 6 at Riocentro-Pavilion 6. For sportspeople with physical or intellectual disabilities going through classification or reclassification in Rio, their in competition observation event is their first appearance in competition at the Games.

== Future ==
Going forward, disability sport's major classification body, the International Paralympic Committee, is working on improving classification to be more of an evidence-based system as opposed to a performance-based system so as not to punish elite athletes whose performance makes them appear in a higher class alongside competitors who train less.
