= Sitting volleyball at the 2016 Summer Paralympics =

Sitting volleyball at the XV Paralympic Games
- Venue: Riocentro Pavilion 6
- Dates: 9–18 September 2016
- Competitors: 96 from 12 nations

Medalists
1st place, gold medalist(s)		Iran (men); United States (women)
2nd place, silver medalist(s)		Bosnia and Herzegovina (men); China (women)
3rd place, bronze medalist(s)		Egypt (men); Brazil (women)

Sitting volleyball at the 2016 Summer Paralympics was held from 9 to 18 September at the Riocentro Pavilion 6 in Rio de Janeiro. Two team events were held, one for men and one for women.

In the men's sitting event, Bosnia and Herzegovina were the defending champions. Bosnia and Herzegovina and Iran were the finalists in 2000, 2004, 2008 and 2012, with Iran winning in 2000 and 2008 and Bosnia and Herzegovina in 2004 and 2012.

The Rio Games was the fourth time the women's sitting volleyball event was contested. China were the defending champions, having defeated the United States for gold in 2012. Ukraine won bronze in 2012, their first ever medal in the event.

This was the fourth Summer Paralympic Games without standing volleyball events, which had been included from the introduction of volleyball in 1976 (when sitting volleyball was a demonstration event) through 2000.

== Classification ==
In sitting volleyball there are two categories of classification: disabled and minimal disability. A maximum of one minimally disabled player may be on the court for each team at any one time.

A part of the player's body between the buttocks and the shoulders must be in contact with the court when playing or attempting to play the ball.

== Qualification ==
16 teams took part: eight men's teams and eight women's teams. Each country could enter one team per tournament.

Men's qualification

Means of qualification	Date	Host	Quota	Qualified
Host country	2 October 2009	(Denmark) Copenhagen	1	Brazil
2014 World Championships	15–21 June 2014	(Poland) Elbląg	2	Bosnia and Herzegovina
2014 World Championships	15–21 June 2014	(Poland) Elbląg	2	Iran
2014 Asian Para Games	18–24 October 2014	(South Korea) Incheon	1	China
2015 African Championships	23–28 July 2015	(Rwanda) Kigali	1	Egypt
2015 Parapan American Games	7–15 August 2015	(Canada) Toronto	1	United States
2015 Men's European Championships	2–7 October 2015	(Germany) Warendorf	1	Germany
World Qualifier	17–23 March 2016	(China) Hangzhou City	1	Ukraine
Total			8	

Women's qualification

Means of qualification	Date	Host	Quota	Qualified
Host country	2 October 2009	(Denmark) Copenhagen	1	Brazil
2014 World Championships	15–21 June 2014	(Poland) Elbląg	2	China
2014 World Championships	15–21 June 2014	(Poland) Elbląg	2	United States
2014 Asian Para Games	18–24 October 2014	(South Korea) Incheon	1	Iran
2015 African Championships	23–28 July 2015	(Rwanda) Kigali	1	Rwanda
2015 Parapan American Games	7–15 August 2015	(Canada) Toronto	1	Canada
2015 Women's European Championships	2–7 October 2015	(Slovenia) Podčetrtek	1	Ukraine
World Qualifier	17–23 March 2016	(China) Hangzhou City	1	Netherlands
Total			8	

== Men's competition ==
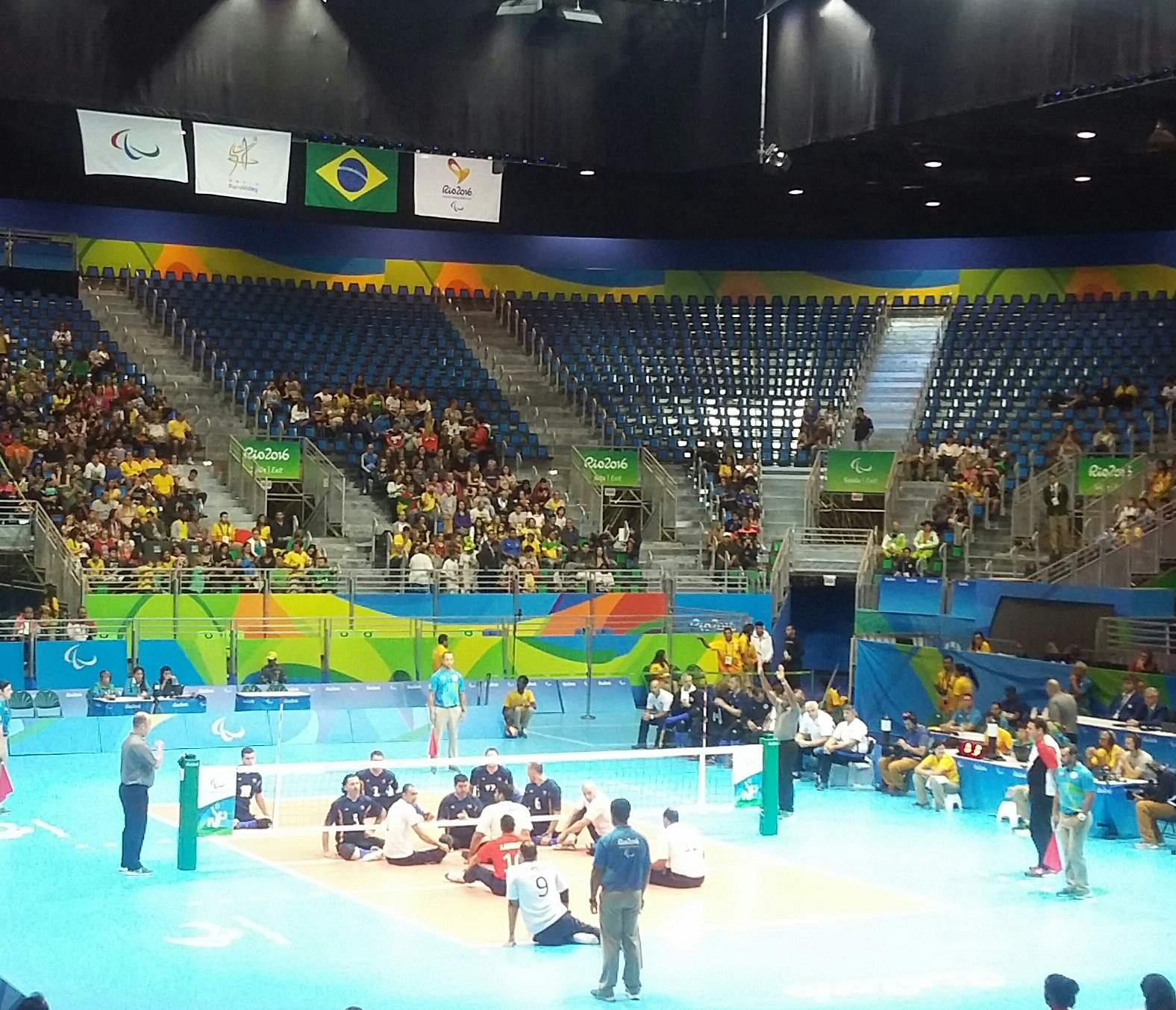
Detail from match, Bosnia and Herzegovina vs Egypt

The competition consisted of two stages: a preliminary round followed by a knockout stage.

=== Preliminary round ===
The teams were divided into two groups of four countries, playing every team in their group once. Two points were awarded for win, one point for a loss. The top four teams per group qualified for the quarter-finals.

=== Group A ===
Pos	Team	Pld	W	L	Pts	SW	SL	SR	SPW	SPL	SPR	Qualification
1	Egypt	3	3	0	6	9	4	2.250	267	234	1.141	Semi-finals
2	Brazil (H)	3	2	1	5	8	4	2.000	278	212	1.311	Semi-finals
3	Germany	3	1	2	4	6	8	0.750	280	288	0.972	Classification 5th / 6th
4	United States	3	0	3	3	2	9	0.222	167	258	0.647	Classification 7th / 8th

Source: Paralympic.org
(H) Host

=== Group B ===
Pos	Team	Pld	W	L	Pts	SW	SL	SR	SPW	SPL	SPR	Qualification
1	Iran	3	3	0	6	9	0	MAX	228	173	1.318	Semi-finals
2	Bosnia and Herzegovina	3	2	1	5	6	3	2.000	206	184	1.120	Semi-finals
3	Ukraine	3	1	2	4	3	8	0.375	237	265	0.894	Classification 5th / 6th
4	China	3	0	3	3	2	9	0.222	216	265	0.815	Classification 7th / 8th

Source: Paralympic.org

=== Knock-out stage ===
Semi-finals
16 September
Egypt	0
Bosnia and Herzegovina	3
16 September
Brazil	0
Iran	3

Gold medal
18 September
Bosnia and Herzegovina	1
Iran	3
Bronze medal
18 September
Egypt	3
Brazil	2

== Women's competition ==
The competition consisted of two stages: a preliminary round followed by a knockout stage.

=== Preliminary round ===
The teams were divided into two groups of four countries, playing every team in their group once. Two points were awarded for a win, one point for a loss. The top four teams per group qualified for the quarter-finals.

=== Group A ===
Pos	Team	Pld	W	L	Pts	SW	SL	SR	SPW	SPL	SPR	Qualification
1	Brazil (H)	3	3	0	6	9	0	MAX	225	140	1.607	Semi-finals
2	Ukraine	3	2	1	5	6	5	1.200	237	229	1.035	Semi-finals
3	Netherlands	3	1	2	4	5	7	0.714	250	265	0.943	Classification 5th / 6th
4	Canada	3	0	3	3	1	9	0.111	169	247	0.684	Classification 7th / 8th

Source: Paralympic.org
(H) Host

=== Group B ===
Pos	Team	Pld	W	L	Pts	SW	SL	SR	SPW	SPL	SPR	Qualification
1	China	3	3	0	6	9	2	4.500	246	169	1.456	Semi-finals
2	United States	3	2	1	5	8	3	2.667	256	156	1.641	Semi-finals
3	Iran	3	1	2	4	3	6	0.500	160	197	0.812	Classification 5th / 6th
4	Rwanda	3	0	3	3	0	9	0.000	85	225	0.378	Classification 7th / 8th

Source: Paralympic.org

=== Knock-out stage ===
Semi-finals
17 September
Brazil	0
United States	3
17 September
Ukraine	0
China	3

Gold medal
18 September
United States	3
China	0
Bronze medal
18 September
Brazil	3
Ukraine	0

== Medalists ==
Event	Gold	Silver	Bronze
Men's team	Iran	Bosnia and Herzegovina	Egypt
Women's team	United States	China	Brazil
