= World Para Volleyball Championship =

World Para Volleyball Championship was first played in 1983 and organized by World ParaVolley.

== Sitting volleyball ==
=== Men's tournament ===
Year	Location	Gold	Silver	Bronze
(Netherlands) 1983	Delden	Netherlands	Germany	Finland
(Norway) 1985	Kristiansand	Iran	Yugoslavia	Netherlands
(Hungary) 1986	Pécs	Iran	Hungary	Netherlands
(United States) 1989	Las Vegas	Netherlands	Hungary	Germany
(Netherlands) 1990	Assen	Iran	Netherlands	Yugoslavia
(Germany) 1994	Bottrop	Iran	Norway	Netherlands
(Iran) 1998	Tehran	Iran	Finland	Bosnia and Herzegovina
(Egypt) 2002	Cairo	Bosnia and Herzegovina	Germany	Iran
(Netherlands) 2006	Roermond	Bosnia and Herzegovina	Iran	Egypt
(United States) 2010	Edmond	Iran	Bosnia and Herzegovina	Egypt
(Poland) 2014	Elbląg	Bosnia and Herzegovina	Brazil	Iran
(Netherlands) 2018	Arnhem	Iran	Bosnia and Herzegovina	Brazil
(Bosnia and Herzegovina) 2022	Sarajevo	Iran	Bosnia and Herzegovina	Brazil
(China) 2026	Hangzhou	Iran	Bosnia and Herzegovina	Kazakhstan

==== Medal table ====
Rank	Nation	Gold	Silver	Bronze	Total
1	Iran	9	1	2	12
2	Bosnia and Herzegovina	3	4	1	8
3	Netherlands	2	1	3	6
4	Germany	0	2	1	3
5	Hungary	0	2	0	2
6	Brazil	0	1	2	3
7	Finland	0	1	1	2
7	Yugoslavia	0	1	1	2
9	Norway	0	1	0	1
10	Egypt	0	0	2	2
11	Kazakhstan	0	0	1	1
Totals (11 entries)		14	14	14	42

=== Women's tournament ===
Year	Location	Gold	Silver	Bronze
(Netherlands) 1994	Delden	Netherlands	Latvia	Lithuania
(Netherlands) 2000	Maastricht	Netherlands	Finland	Slovenia
(Slovenia) 2002	Kamnik	Netherlands	Slovenia	Finland
(Netherlands) 2006	Roermond	Netherlands	China	Slovenia
(United States) 2010	Edmond	China	United States	Ukraine
(Poland) 2014	Elbląg	China	United States	Russia
(Netherlands) 2018	Arnhem	Russia	United States	China
(Bosnia and Herzegovina) 2022	Sarajevo	Brazil	Canada	United States
(China) 2026	Hangzhou	United States	Brazil	China

==== Medal table ====
Rank	Nation	Gold	Silver	Bronze	Total
1	Netherlands	4	0	0	4
2	China	2	1	2	5
3	United States	1	3	1	5
4	Brazil	1	1	0	2
5	Russia	1	0	1	2
6	Slovenia	0	1	2	3
7	Finland	0	1	1	2
8	Canada	0	1	0	1
8	Latvia	0	1	0	1
10	Lithuania	0	0	1	1
10	Ukraine	0	0	1	1
Totals (11 entries)		9	9	9	27

=== Beach ===
Year	Location	Gold	Silver	Bronze
(China) 2024	Chongqing	Poland	India	Slovakia
(Turkey) 2025	Mersin	Poland	Latvia	United States

== Ranking ==
=== Men ===
Team	(Netherlands); 1983	(Norway); 1985	(Hungary); 1986	(United States); 1989	(Netherlands); 1990	(Germany); 1994	(Iran); 1998	(Egypt); 2002	(Netherlands); 2006	(United States); 2010	(Poland); 2014	(Netherlands); 2018	(Bosnia and Herzegovina); 2022	(China); 2026
Australia	-	-	-	-	-	-	12	-	-	-	-	-	-	-
Austria	-	9	9	-	-	-	-	-	-	-	-	-	-	-
Bosnia and Herzegovina	-	-	-	-	-	-	3rd place, bronze medalist(s)	1st place, gold medalist(s)	1st place, gold medalist(s)	2nd place, silver medalist(s)	1st place, gold medalist(s)	2nd place, silver medalist(s)	2nd place, silver medalist(s)	2nd place, silver medalist(s)
Brazil	-	-	-	-	-	-	-	-	11	8	2nd place, silver medalist(s)	3rd place, bronze medalist(s)	3rd place, bronze medalist(s)	4
Canada	-	-	-	-	-	-	-	-	-	-	-	-	11	15
China	-	-	-	-	-	-	-	-	6	7	8	7	-	13
Croatia	-	-	-	-	-	-	-	-	7	9	11	13	10	11
Czechoslovakia	-	-	10	-	-	-	-	-	-	-	-	-	-	-
Egypt	-	-	11	-	-	-	7	4	3rd place, bronze medalist(s)	3rd place, bronze medalist(s)	4	6	4	7
Finland	3rd place, bronze medalist(s)	8	7	5	8	4	2nd place, silver medalist(s)	-	-	-	-	-	-	-
Germany	-	-	-	-	-	6	5	2nd place, silver medalist(s)	4	6	6	10	5	6
Great Britain	-	10	13	7	9	-	-	-	-	-	-	-	-	
Hungary	-	6	2nd place, silver medalist(s)	2nd place, silver medalist(s)	4	5	-	7	-	-	-	-	-	-
Iran	-	1st place, gold medalist(s)	1st place, gold medalist(s)	-	1st place, gold medalist(s)	1st place, gold medalist(s)	1st place, gold medalist(s)	3rd place, bronze medalist(s)	2nd place, silver medalist(s)	1st place, gold medalist(s)	3rd place, bronze medalist(s)	1st place, gold medalist(s)	1st place, gold medalist(s)	1st place, gold medalist(s)
Iraq	-	-	-	6	-	-	9	6	10	-	-	14	9	12
Japan	-	-	-	-	-	-	11	8	12	-	-	15	16	16
Kazakhstan	-	-	-	-	-	-	8	-	-	-	-	9	7	3rd place, bronze medalist(s)
Morocco	-	-	-	-	-	-	-	9	-	-	-	-	-	-
Netherlands	1st place, gold medalist(s)	3rd place, bronze medalist(s)	3rd place, bronze medalist(s)	1st place, gold medalist(s)	2nd place, silver medalist(s)	3rd place, bronze medalist(s)	4	5	8	12	9	11	14	-
Norway	-	5	5	4	6	2nd place, silver medalist(s)	6	-	-	-	-	-	-	-
Poland	-	-	-	-	-	-	-	-	-	-	12	12	12	10
Russia	-	-	-	-	-	-	-	-	5	4	5	5	-	-
Rwanda	-	-	-	-	-	-	-	-	-	-	-	16	13	8
Serbia	-	-	-	-	-	-	-	-	-	11	-	-	15	-
Slovenia	-	-	-	-	-	7	10	-	-	-	-	-	-	-
Sweden	-	4	8	-	7	8	-	-	-	-	-	-	-	-
Switzerland	-	-	-	8	-	-	-	-	-	-	-	-	-	-
Thailand	-	-	-	-	-	-	-	-	-	-	-	-	-	14
West Germany	2nd place, silver medalist(s)	7	6	3rd place, bronze medalist(s)	5	-	-	-	-	-	-	-	-	-
Ukraine	-	-	-	-	-	-	-	-	-	5	7	4	8	9
United States	-	-	12	9	-	-	-	10	9	10	10	8	6	5
Yugoslavia	-	2nd place, silver medalist(s)	4	-	3rd place, bronze medalist(s)	-	-	-	-	-	-	-	-	-
Total teams	10	13	9	9	8	12	10	12	12	12	12	16	16	16

=== Women ===
Team	(Netherlands); 1994	(Netherlands); 2000	(Slovenia); 2002	(Netherlands); 2006	(United States); 2010	(Poland); 2014	(Netherlands); 2018	(Bosnia and Herzegovina); 2022	(China); 2026
Bosnia and Herzegovina	-	-	-	-	-	-	-	13	-
Brazil	-	-	-	8	10	6	5	1st place, gold medalist(s)	2nd place, silver medalist(s)
Canada	-	-	-	-	12	-	7	2nd place, silver medalist(s)	4
China	-	-	4	2nd place, silver medalist(s)	1st place, gold medalist(s)	1st place, gold medalist(s)	3rd place, bronze medalist(s)	-	3rd place, bronze medalist(s)
Croatia	-	-	-	-	-	-	16	-	-
Egypt	-	-	-	-	-	-	15	-	-
Finland	-	2nd place, silver medalist(s)	3rd place, bronze medalist(s)	-	-	8	12	10	-
France	-	-	-	-	-	-	-	-	16
Germany	5	4	-	-	6	10	-	6	12
Great Britain	-	-	-	-	11	11	-	-	-
Hungary	-	-	-	-	-	-	14	11	15
Iran	-	8	8	-	-	9	-	9	7
Italy	-	-	-	-	-	-	4	5	5
Japan	-	5	6	7	9	9	10	-	8
Kenya	-	-	-	-	-	-	-	-	13
Latvia	2nd place, silver medalist(s)	-	-	-	-	-	-	-	-
Lithuania	3rd place, bronze medalist(s)	-	5	4	8	-	-	-	-
Mongolia	-	6	-	-	-	-	-	-	-
Netherlands	1st place, gold medalist(s)	1st place, gold medalist(s)	1st place, gold medalist(s)	1st place, gold medalist(s)	4	4	8	-	9
Poland	-	-	-	-	-	12	-	12	-
Russia	4	-	-	-	7	3rd place, bronze medalist(s)	1st place, gold medalist(s)	-	-
Rwanda	-	-	-	-	-	-	11	8	11
Slovenia	-	3rd place, bronze medalist(s)	2nd place, silver medalist(s)	3rd place, bronze medalist(s)	5	7	13	4	10
Thailand	-	-	-	-	-	-	-	-	14
Ukraine	6	7	7	6	3rd place, bronze medalist(s)	5	6	7	6
United States	-	-	-	5	2nd place, silver medalist(s)	2nd place, silver medalist(s)	2nd place, silver medalist(s)	3rd place, bronze medalist(s)	1st place, gold medalist(s)
Total teams	6	8	8	8	12	12	16	13	16

== Youth World Para Volleyball Championship ==
=== Junior World Championships ===
Year	Ref
(Slovenia) 2005 Kamnik	
(Brazil) 2007 Niterói	
(Iran) 2009 Mashhad	

== See also ==
- Pieter Joon - World Organization Volleyball for Disabled (WOVD) founder and former president
- Volleyball variations
- Volleyball at the Summer Paralympics
- World ParaVolley
- Sitting volleyball
- VolleySLIDE
- Women's European Sitting Volleyball Championships
- Men's European Sitting Volleyball Championships
