= Sitting volleyball =

Variant of volleyball where the players sit on the floor

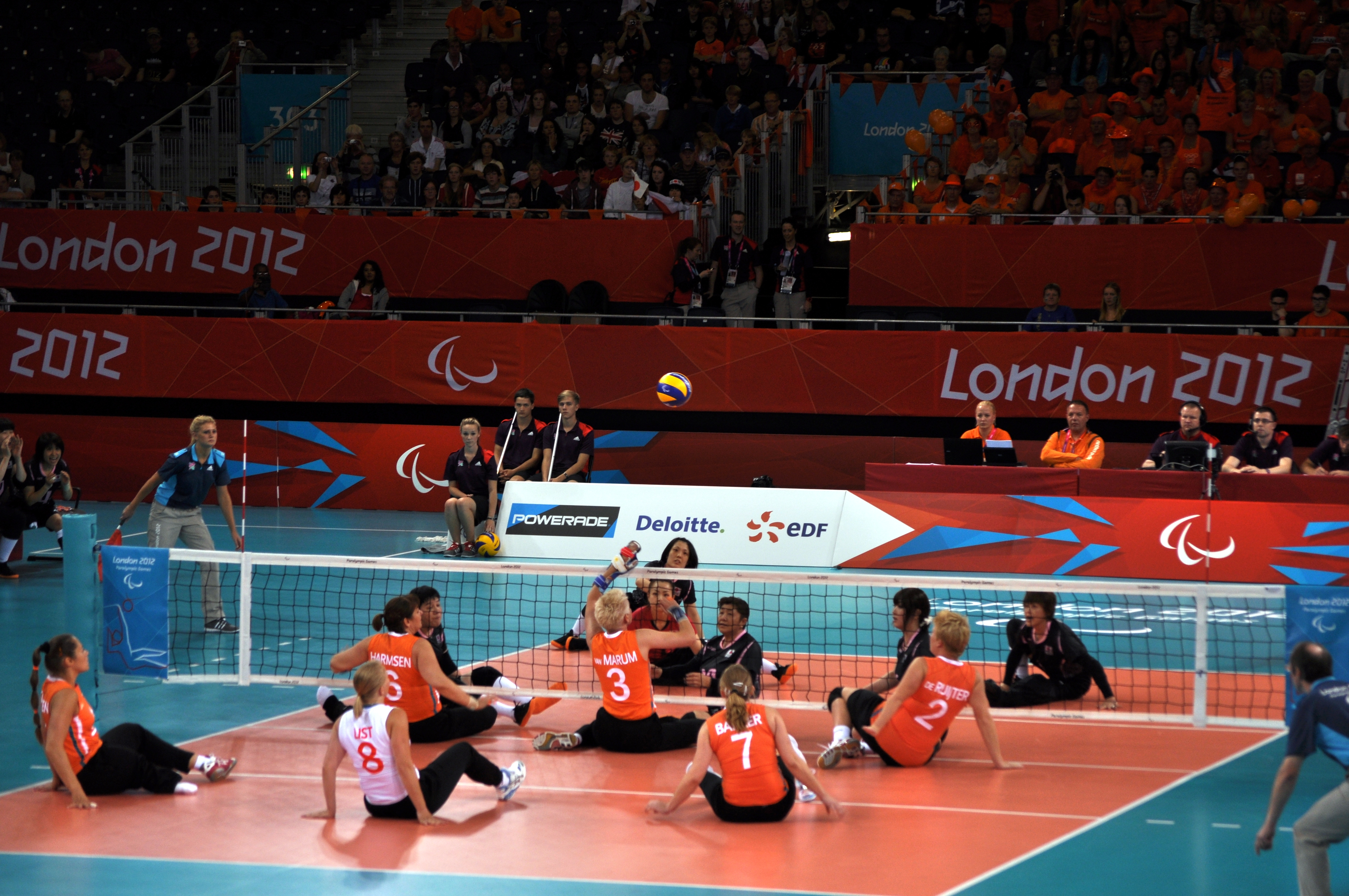
- Highest governing body: 1. ISMGF (1956–1981) No organ 2. ISOD (1981–1992); 3. ISOD (1992–1994) Separate; 4. WOVD (1994–2014); 5. WPV (2014-present)

Characteristics
- Mixed-sex: No
- Type: Indoor

Presence
- Paralympic: 1976–1980

Sitting volleyball is a form of volleyball for athletes with disabilities governed by the sport’s international federation World ParaVolley.

== Sitting volleyball at the Paralympics ==
Sitting volleyball was invented in the Netherlands by the Dutch Sport Committee in 1956 as a rehabilitation sport for injured soldiers. In 1958, the first international sitting volleyball contact was held between Germany and Dutch club teams.

It was created as a combination of volleyball and sitzball, a German sport with no net and seated players. Sitting volleyball first appeared in the 1976 Summer Paralympics as a demonstration sport for athletes with impaired mobility, and both standing and sitting volleyball became officially included in the Paralympic programme in Arnhem, the Netherlands at the 1980 Summer Paralympics. Women's sitting volleyball was added for the 2004 Summer Paralympics.

The London 2012 Paralympic Games broke the record for participation numbers with 197 athletes representing 15 countries.

After the London 2012 games, VolleySLIDE was founded by Matt Rogers to promote and develop the sport globally. Eight men's and eight women's teams competed in the 2020 Tokyo Paralympic Games.

== Rules ==
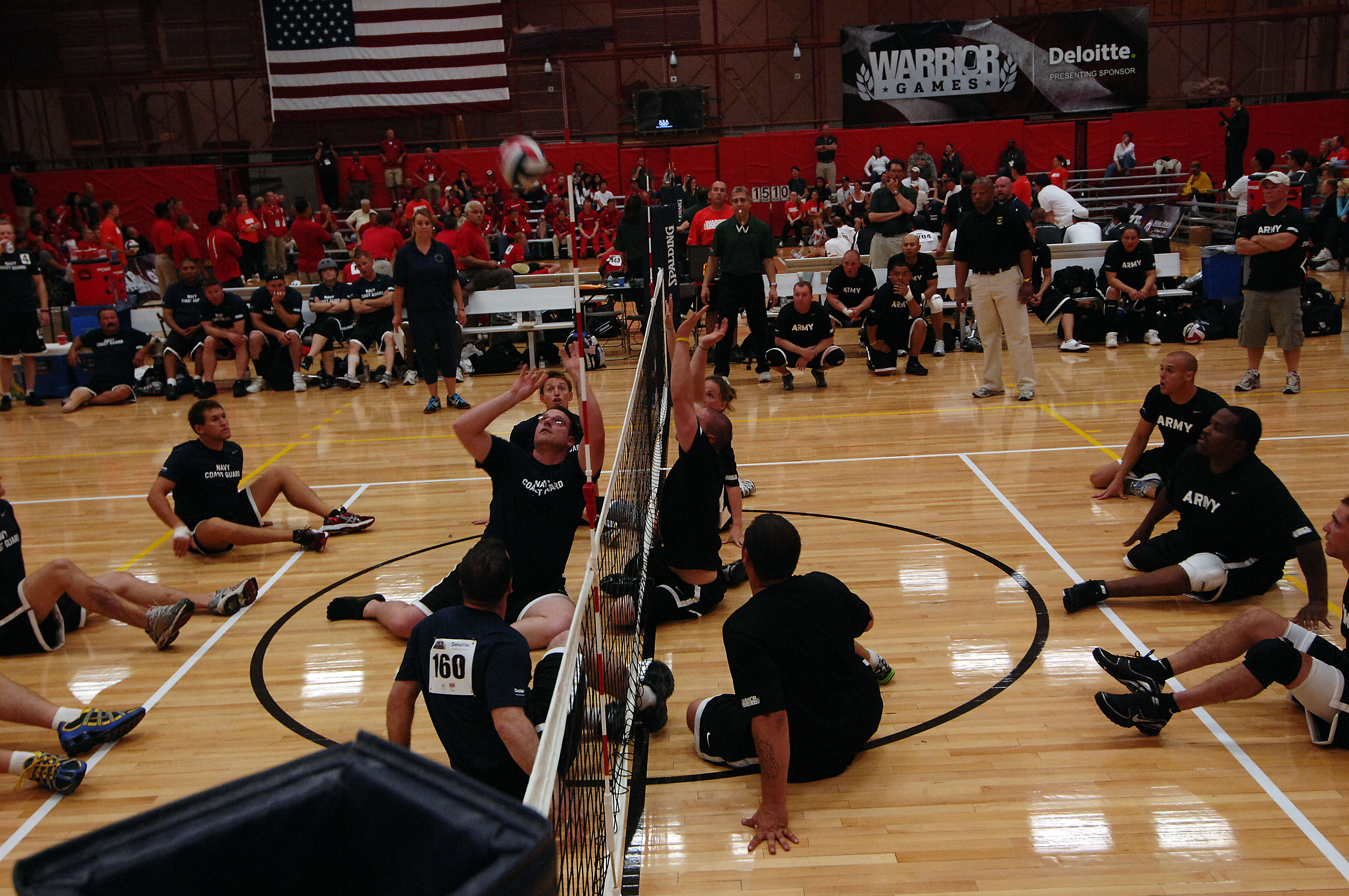
Men's sitting volleyball match between a combined US Navy-Coast Guard team and the US Army

The sitting volleyball rules comply with the FIVB rules for standard volleyball with few minor adjustments. players must have at least one buttock in contact with the floor whenever they make contact with the ball and it is also possible to block the serve. In sitting volleyball, a 7-metre-long (23 ft), 0.8-metre-wide (2 ft 7 in) net is set at 1.15 metres (3.8 feet) high for men and 1.05 metres (3.4 feet) high for women. The court is 10 by 6 metres (33 by 20 feet) with a 2-metre (6.6-foot) attack line. The teams consist of 6 athletes each, permitted with up to three ball touches per team before sending the ball over the net. The game is considered faster than standered volleyball. It is played in a best of five match format and the first to reach 25 points ( with minimum 2-point lead wins the set.

=== Classification ===
Athletes with the following disabilities are eligible to compete in sitting volleyball: athletes with amputations, spinal cord injuries, cerebral palsy, brain injuries and stroke. Classifications of these athletes by disability are placed into two categories:

VS1- Athletes in this class have a higher degree of functional loss, as muscular strength deficit, lack of adaptation and adaptation i the joint.

VS2- Athletes participating in this class have a lower degree of functional loss, which allows a little bit more movement and flexibility.

Only two VS2 players are allowed on the court at a time; this is to keep the competition fair between rival teams. The rest of the team must be classified as VS1 players.

Research has also been done on the relationship between physical form and body composition with athleticism in sitting volleyball. There was a study that was conducted in 2022 involving 35 male athletes that are apart of sitting volleyball. They compared players placed in VS1 and VS2 classifications with non-disabled athletes. The body composition, muscle strength, and athletic performance in sprint and agility tests were examined. The results showed that muscle strength and body composition were affecting the performance in the tests. The authors of the study concluded that there were differences in physical characteristics between different categories of athletes. But, they didn’t provide concrete explanation of the current classification system.

=== Injuries ===
Within sports athletes can experience many different types of injuries. Since injuries can be slightly severe to extreme there have been studies over this. There was a study done over 56 injuries in the 2023 to 2024 season of the Iran Sitting Volleyball Super League. But, a total of 80 injuries were reported among 30 players, giving an overall injury rate of 6.2 injuries per 1,00 athletes-days. The studies determined that fingers and wrists were the most commonly injured parts of the body. Injuries were reported to occur more often during the competition period compared to practice. Many of the injuries reported were related injuries indicating that players go through the same injury multiple times in their time of playing the game.

=== Skills ===
Skills are largely identical to the sport of volleyball and the following game terminology apply:

- Ace – A serve that lands in the opponent's court without being touched.
- Attack – An attempt by a player to win a point by hitting the ball over the net.
- Attack line – In indoor volleyball, a line three metres from the net which marks the limit for where a back-row player may advance to hit a ball from above the net.
- Back-row player – In indoor volleyball, any of three players positioned at the back of the court.
- Block – To block an opposing player from spiking the ball by jumping at the net with arms in the air.
- Boom – In beach volleyball, a spike straight down into the sand (slang).
- Centre line – In indoor volleyball, the imaginary line running directly under the net and dividing the court in half.
- Chuck – To push or throw the ball rather than hit it (slang).
- Court – The playing area.
- Crossing space – The zone above the net and between two antennae through which the ball must pass during a rally.
- Dig – A defensive move in which both arms are placed together in an attempt to bounce a hard-hit ball up into the air.
- End line – A back boundary line of the court.
- Facial – A boom or spike that hits an opponent in the face (slang).
- Fault – A foul or error which results in the loss of the rally.
- Front-row player – In indoor volleyball, any of three players positioned closest to the net.
- Front zone – In indoor volleyball, the area between the net and the attack line.
- Ground – To hit the ball to the ground, preferably on the other team's court.
- Heater – A hard-hit or spiked ball (slang).
- Hit – To touch the ball as an offensive player, one of three "hits" allowed a team in getting the ball back over the net.
- Hold – To let the ball settle into the hands briefly on a shot instead of releasing it immediately.
- Joust – A joust occurs above the net between two or more opposing players that forces the ball to become stationary. Point is replayed.
- Kill – To smash the ball overarm into the opponent's court; also called a "spike".
- Kong – A one-handed block, named after King Kong's style of swatting biplanes in the original King Kong movie (slang).
- Libero – In indoor volleyball, a substitute defensive player especially adept at digging.
- Lip – A good dig (slang)
- Match – A series of sets to determine a winner.
- Mintonette – The original name for volleyball.
- Missile – A spike or serve hit out of bounds (slang).
- Pass – the attempt by a team to properly handle the opponent's serve, or any form of attack.
- Rally – The exchange of plays that decides each point.
- Rotate – In indoor volleyball, to move to the next position on the floor in a clockwise manner.
- Screen – To impede the opponent's view of the ball during the serve.
- Serve – The stroke used to put the ball in play at the start of each rally.
- Set – 1. The part of a match completed when one side has scored enough points to win a single contest. 2. To position the ball so a teammate can attack.
- Setter – A player who excels in setting up teammates to attack.
- Sideline – A side boundary line on a court.
- Spade – An ace (slang).
- Spike – To smash the ball overarm into the opponent's court; also called a "kill".
- Windmill Spike (hand movement during Spike follows motion of windmill).

== Members ==
List also includes former members (national teams that took part in previous major tournaments).

List of sitting volleyball national teams

- Algeria
- Argentina
- Australia
- Austria
- Azerbaijan
- Bosnia and Herzegovina
- Burundi
- Brazil
- Canada
- Cambodia
- China
- Colombia
- Costa Rica
- Croatia
- Cuba
- Czech Republic
- DR Congo
- Egypt
- Estonia
- Great Britain
- France
- Finland
- Germany
- Greece
- Hungary
- Iran
- Iraq
- Italy
- Japan
- Kazakhstan
- Kenya
- Libya
- Latvia
- Lithuania
- Luxembourg
- Malta
- Mexico
- Mongolia
- Morocco
- Myanmar
- Netherlands
- Norway
- Philippines
- Poland
- Russia
- Rwanda
- Serbia
- Slovenia
- South Africa
- Sri Lanka
- Sweden
- South Korea
- United States
- Ukraine

Defunct national teams

- Czechoslovakia
- West Germany
- Yugoslavia

== Championships ==
=== Paralympics ===
Sitting volleyball was first demonstrated at the Summer Paralympic Games in 1976 and was introduced as a full Paralympic event in 1980. The 2000 games was the last time standing volleyball appeared on the Paralympic programme. The women's sitting volleyball event introduction followed in the 2004 Paralympic Games.

== World ParaVolley (formerly WOVD) World Championships ==
=== Sitting ===
==== Men's Sitting – past winners ====
Year	Location	Gold	Silver	Bronze
(Netherlands) 1983	Delden	Netherlands	Germany	Finland
(Norway) 1985	Kristiansand	Iran	(Socialist Federal Republic of Yugoslavia) Yugoslavia	Netherlands
(Hungary) 1986	Pécs	Iran	Hungary	Netherlands
(United States) 1989	Las Vegas	Netherlands	Hungary	Germany
(Netherlands) 1990	Assen	Iran	Netherlands	(Socialist Federal Republic of Yugoslavia) Yugoslavia
(Germany) 1994	Bottrop	Iran	Norway	Netherlands
(Iran) 1998	Tehran	Iran	Finland	Bosnia and Herzegovina
(Egypt) 2002	Cairo	Bosnia and Herzegovina	Germany	Iran
(Netherlands) 2006	Roermond	Bosnia and Herzegovina	Iran	Egypt
(United States) 2010	Edmond	Iran	Bosnia and Herzegovina	Egypt
(Poland) 2014	Elbląg	Bosnia and Herzegovina	Brazil	Iran
(Netherlands) 2018	The Hague	Iran	Bosnia and Herzegovina	Ukraine
(Bosnia and Herzegovina) 2022	Sarajevo	Iran	Bosnia and Herzegovina	Brazil
(China) 2026	Hangzhou			

=== Ranking ===
Rank	Nation	Gold	Silver	Bronze	Total
1	Iran	8	1	2	11
2	Bosnia and Herzegovina	3	3	1	7
3	Netherlands	2	1	3	6
4	Germany	0	2	1	3
5	Hungary	0	2	0	2
6	Brazil	0	1	1	2
6	Finland	0	1	1	2
6	Yugoslavia	0	1	1	2
9	Norway	0	1	0	1
10	Egypt	0	0	2	2
11	Ukraine	0	0	1	1
Totals (11 entries)		13	13	13	39

==== Women's Sitting – past winners ====
Year	Location	Gold	Silver	Bronze
(Germany) 1994	Bottrop	Netherlands	Latvia	Lithuania
(Netherlands) 2000	Maastricht	Netherlands	Finland	Slovenia
(Slovenia) 2002	Kamnik	Netherlands	Slovenia	Finland
(Netherlands) 2006	Roermond	Netherlands	China	Slovenia
(United States) 2010	Edmond	China	United States	Ukraine
(Poland) 2014	Elbląg	China	United States	Russia
(Netherlands) 2018	Rotterdam	Russia	United States	China
(Bosnia and Herzegovina) 2022	Sarajevo	Brazil	Canada	United States
(China) 2026	Hangzhou	United States	Brazil	China

=== Ranking ===
Rank	Nation	Gold	Silver	Bronze	Total
1	Netherlands	4	0	0	4
2	China	2	1	2	5
3	United States	1	3	1	5
4	Brazil	1	1	0	2
5	Russia	1	0	1	2
6	Slovenia	0	1	2	3
7	Finland	0	1	1	2
8	Canada	0	1	0	1
8	Latvia	0	1	0	1
10	Lithuania	0	0	1	1
10	Ukraine	0	0	1	1
Totals (11 entries)		9	9	9	27

== ParaVolley Europe (formerly ECVD) European Championships ==
Euro Federation

https://paravolley.eu/

https://paravolley.eu/competitions

https://paravolley.eu/competitions/history/roll-of-honour

NATIONS LEAGUE 2024

=== Men's Sitting – past winners ===
Winners of European Championships of sitting volleyball (as of 13 May 2024)
Edition	Year	City	Gold medal	Silver medal	Bronze medal
I	1981	Bonn	NED	FRG	SWE
II	1983	Delten	NED	FRG	FIN
III	1985	Kristiansand	NED	YUG	SWE
IV	1987	Sarajevo	NED	YUG	NOR
V	1991	Nottingham	NED	HUN	NOR
VI	1993	Järvenpää	NOR	FIN	HUN
VII	1995	Ljubljana	HUN	NOR	NED
VIII	1997	Tallinn	FIN	NOR	BIH
IX	1999	Sarajevo	BIH	GER	FIN
X	2001	Sárospatak	BIH	GER	NED
XI	2003	Lappeenranta	BIH	GER	FIN
XII	2005	Leverkusen	BIH	GER	RUS
XIII	2007	Nyíregyháza	BIH	RUS	GER
XIV	2009	Elbląg	BIH	RUS	GER
XV	2011	Rotterdam	BIH	RUS	GER
XVI	2013	Elbląg	BIH	RUS	GER
XVII	2015	Warendorf	BIH	GER	RUS
XVIII	2017	Poreč	RUS	UKR	BIH
XIX	2019	Budapest	RUS	BIH	GER
XX	2021	Kemer	BIH	RUS	GER
XXI	2023	Caorle	BIH	GER	UKR
XXI	2025	Győr	BIH	GER	UKR

Year	Location	Gold	Silver	Bronze
(Germany) 1981	Bonn	Netherlands	Germany	Sweden
(Netherlands) 1983	Delden	Netherlands	West Germany	Finland
(Norway) 1985	Kristiansand	Netherlands	Yugoslavia	Sweden
(Socialist Federal Republic of Yugoslavia) 1987	Sarajevo	Netherlands	(Socialist Federal Republic of Yugoslavia) Yugoslavia	Norway
1989 Not Held
(United Kingdom) 1991	Nottingham	Netherlands	Hungary	Norway
(Finland) 1993	Järvenpää	Norway	Finland	Hungary
(Slovenia) 1995	Ljubljana	Hungary	Norway	Netherlands
(Estonia) 1997	Tallinn	Finland	Norway	Bosnia and Herzegovina
(Bosnia and Herzegovina) 1999	Sarajevo	Bosnia and Herzegovina	Germany	Finland
(Hungary) 2001	Sárospatak	Bosnia and Herzegovina	Germany	Netherlands
(Finland) 2003	Lappeenranta	Bosnia and Herzegovina	Germany	Finland
(Germany) 2005	Leverkusen	Bosnia and Herzegovina	Germany	Russia
(Hungary) 2007	Nyíregyháza	Bosnia and Herzegovina	Russia	Germany
(Poland) 2009	Elbląg	Bosnia and Herzegovina	Russia	Germany
(Netherlands) 2011	Rotterdam	Bosnia and Herzegovina	Russia	Germany
(Poland) 2013	Elbląg	Bosnia and Herzegovina	Russia	Germany
(Germany) 2015	Warendorf	Bosnia and Herzegovina	Germany	Russia
(Croatia) 2017	Poreč	Russia	Ukraine	Bosnia and Herzegovina
(Hungary) 2019	Budapest	Russia	Bosnia and Herzegovina	Germany
(Turkey) 2021	Antalya	Bosnia and Herzegovina	Russia	Germany
(Italy) 2023	Caorle	Bosnia and Herzegovina	Germany	Ukraine
(Hungary) 2025	Győr	Bosnia and Herzegovina	Germany	Ukraine

=== Women's Sitting – past winners ===
Year	Location	Gold	Silver	Bronze
1993	(Finland) Järvenpää	Netherlands	Finland	Estonia
1995	(Slovenia) Ljubljana	Netherlands	Latvia	Slovenia
1997	(Estonia) Tallinn	Latvia	Lithuania	Netherlands
1999	(Bosnia and Herzegovina) Sarajevo	Slovenia	Finland	Netherlands
2001	(Hungary) Sárospatak	Netherlands	Slovenia	Finland
2003	(Finland) Lappeenranta	Netherlands	Slovenia	Finland
2005	(Germany) Leverkusen	Netherlands	Lithuania	Slovenia
2007	(Hungary) Nyíregyháza	Netherlands	Ukraine	Slovenia
2009	(Poland) Elbląg	Netherlands	Ukraine	Slovenia
2011	(Netherlands) Rotterdam	Ukraine	Netherlands	Russia
2013	(Poland) Elbląg	Russia	Ukraine	Slovenia
2015	(Slovenia) Podčetrtek	Ukraine	Russia	Slovenia
2017	(Croatia) Poreč	Russia	Ukraine	Netherlands
2019	(Hungary) Budapest	Russia	Italy	Ukraine
2021	(Turkey) Antalya	Russia	Italy	Germany
2023	(Italy) Caorle	Italy	Slovenia	Ukraine
2025	(Hungary) Győr	Italy	Netherlands	Ukraine

=== Men (1981–2025) ===
Rank	Nation	Gold	Silver	Bronze	Total
1	Bosnia and Herzegovina	12	1	2	15
2	Netherlands	5	0	2	7
3	Russia	2	5	2	9
4	Norway	1	2	2	5
5	Finland	1	1	3	5
6	Hungary	1	1	1	3
7	Germany	0	9	6	15
8	Yugoslavia	0	2	0	2
9	Ukraine	0	1	2	3
10	Sweden	0	0	2	2
Totals (10 entries)		22	22	22	66

=== Women (1993–2025) ===
Rank	Nation	Gold	Silver	Bronze	Total
1	Netherlands	7	2	3	12
2	Russia	4	1	1	6
3	Ukraine	2	4	3	9
4	Italy	2	2	0	4
5	Slovenia	1	3	6	10
6	Latvia	1	1	0	2
7	Finland	0	2	2	4
8	Lithuania	0	2	0	2
9	Estonia	0	0	1	1
9	Germany	0	0	1	1
Totals (10 entries)		17	17	17	51

== See also ==
- Women's European Sitting Volleyball Championships
- Men's European Sitting Volleyball Championships
- Pieter Joon - World Organization Volleyball for Disabled (WOVD) founder and former president
- Volleyball variations
- Volleyball at the Summer Paralympics
- World Para Volleyball Championship
- 2022 Sitting Volleyball World Championships – Men's event
- 2022 Sitting Volleyball World Championships – Women's event
- 2023 Asia and Oceania Sitting Volleyball Championships
- Sitting volleyball at the Asian Para Games
- 2023 Sitting Volleyball World Cup – Men's event
- 2023 Sitting Volleyball World Cup – Women's event
