= 2025 Sitting Volleyball European Championships – Men's event =

Sitting volleyball tournament in Hungary

2025 Sitting Volleyball European Championships

Tournament details
- Host country: Hungary
- City: Győr
- Dates: 28 July – 2 August
- Teams: 12 (from 1 confederation)
- Venue: 1 (in 1 host city)

Final positions
- Champions: Bosnia and Herzegovina (12th title)
- Runners-up: Germany
- Third place: Ukraine
- Fourth place: Serbia

Tournament statistics
- Matches played: 46

The 2025 Sitting Volleyball European Championships – Men's event was the 22nd edition of the biannual continental championship, contested by the senior men's national sitting volleyball teams in Europe, sanctioned by ParaVolley Europe. It was held in Győr, Hungary from 28 July to 2 August 2025, marking the fourth time the event is held in the country.

Twelve teams took part for the twelfth time, the same as the previous edition.

The tournament acted as qualification for the 2026 Sitting Volleyball World Championships in Hangzhou, China, with three spots available.

Bosnia and Herzegovina are the defending champions, after beating Germany 3–2 in the 2023 final in Caorle. Bosnia and Herzegovina defended their title after beating Germany 3–0 in the final to win their twelfth title.

== Host selection ==
On 4 September 2024, Budapest, Hungary was given the hosting rights. This marks the fourth time the country hosts the event, after 2001, 2007 and 2019.

=== Quotes ===
“In the last five years, we have witnessed a huge development in ParaVolley Europe, and the #EuroSittingVolley will be back to Budapest. We are in a new era of paravolley, and expect an even better event compared to the one held in the Hungarian capital six years ago, and that was already an excellent one.”

— Branko Mihorko, ParaVolley Europe president.

“Our country can not only be a good organiser again, but can also hope for a successful performance. The previous year was also good for our Sitting Volleyball players, the women's national team finished fifth in the European Championship, but the men also perform better and better every year. We are confident that the 2025 event will also promote their professional development. Furthermore, the Hungarian Volleyball Federation seized the chance to organise the event because believes in social responsibility, and considers it important that Sitting Volleyball and sport belong to everyone, and with this event also wants to draw attention to this matter,”

— Gabriella Vatai, Hungarian Volleyball Federation president.

=== Change of venue ===
On 19 February 2025, following a request by the original venue, the Ludovika University of Public Service in Budapest, to fulfil their purpose-specific obligations, the host city was changed from Budapest to Győr.

=== Preparations ===
- On 21 December 2024, the hosting contract was signed.
- On 12 June 2025, the competition website went live.

== Teams ==
Twelve teams took part for the twelfth time, the same as the previous edition. France and Netherlands are present after being absent in 2023. Lithuania and Slovenia didn't participate after taking part in 2023.

Team	Appearance(s)					Previous best performance (Note: Bold text indicates they hosted that edition.)
Team	Total	First	Last	Streak	2023	Previous best performance
Bosnia and Herzegovina	16th	1995	2023	16	1st	Champions (1999, 2001, 2003, 2005, 2007, 2009, 2011, 2013, 2015, 2021, 2023)
Croatia	17th	1993	2023	17	5th	Fourth place (2005, 2017)
France	2nd	2021		1	N/A	Fifteenth place (2021)
Germany (Note: Including results as West Germany.)	22nd	1981	2023	22	2nd	Runners-up (1981, 1983, 1999, 2001, 2003, 2005, 2015, 2023)
Hungary (H)	18th	1983	2023	7	9th	Champions (1995)
Italy	5th	2015	2023	3	8th	Eighth place (2023)
Latvia	15th	1993	2023	7	6th	Sixth place (2023)
Netherlands	21st	1993	2021	1	N/A	Champions (1981, 1983, 1985, 1987, 1989)
Poland	14th	1999	2023	14	4th	Fourth place (2023)
Serbia (Note: Including results as Serbia and Montenegro.)	11th	1999	2023	11	7th	Fifth place (2009, 2021)
Turkey	5th	2017	2023	5	10th	Ninth place (2019, 2021)
Ukraine	17th	1993	2023	17	3rd	Runners-up (2017)

== Venue ==
The Olympic Sports Park in Győr was the venue. The complex hosted Athletics, Gymnastics, Judo and Tennis at the 2017 European Youth Summer Olympic Festival. This is the first time the city will hold the championship. Three separate courts were used at the arena.

2025 Sitting Volleyball European Championships – Men's event is located in Hungary	Győr
2025 Sitting Volleyball European Championships – Men's event is located in Hungary	Olympic Sports Park
2025 Sitting Volleyball European Championships – Men's event is located in Hungary	Capacity: Unknown

== Draw ==
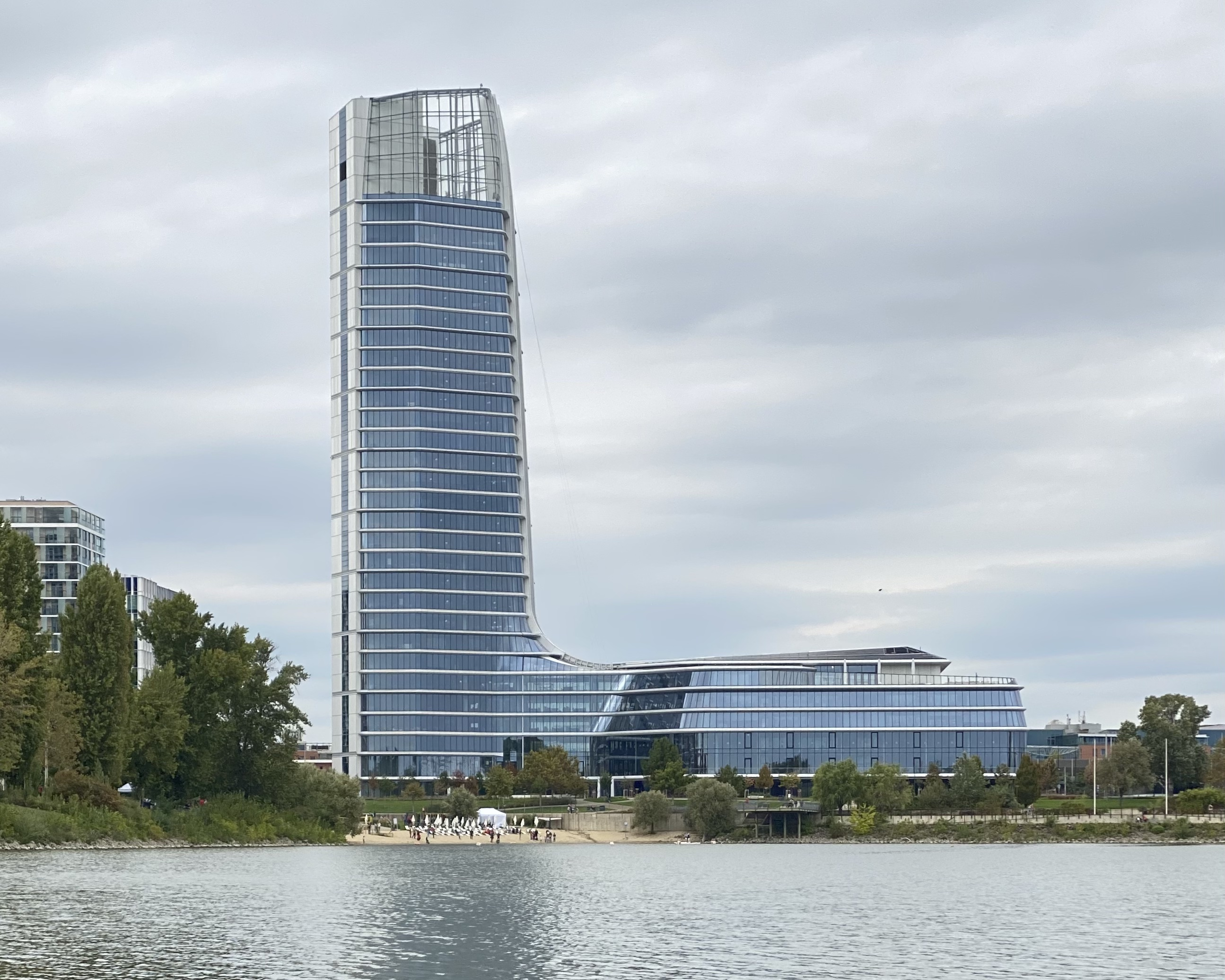
The MOL Campus in Budapest hosted the draw.

The draw was held at 14:00 CET on 19 May 2025 at the Virtu restaurant, on the 28th floor of the MOL Campus in Budapest, Hungary. The draw started with, in order, pots 1, 2 and 3 being drawn, with each team selected then allocated into the first available group alphabetically. Hosts Hungary were pre-allocated into A1.

=== Seeding ===
The seeding was based on the ParaVolley Europe rankings.

Pot 1
Team
Hungary (H)
Bosnia and Herzegovina
Croatia
Germany

Pot 2
Team
Poland
Serbia
Ukraine
Netherlands

Pot 3
Team
Latvia
Italy
Turkey
France

- 2025 Sitting Volleyball European Championships – Draw
- Draw Live Stream

=== Draw results ===
Group A
Pos	Team
A1	Hungary (H)
A2	Croatia
A3	Poland
A4	Ukraine
A5	France
A6	Turkey

Group B
Pos	Team
B1	Bosnia and Herzegovina
B2	Germany
B3	Serbia
B4	Netherlands
B5	Latvia
B6	Italy

== Format ==
12 teams are split into two groups of six. The top four in each group plays in the Quarterfinals, while the bottom 2 in each group plays in the classification rounds.

== Opening ceremony ==
The opening ceremony took place on 27 July, a day before the tournament began. The opening ceremony contained a parade of nations and a performance from JP Dance Company.

== Group stage ==
- All times are local.
- The top four teams in each pool qualify for the knockout stage.
- Match won 3–0 or 3–1: 3 match points for the winner, 0 match points for the loser
- Match won 3–2: 2 match points for the winner, 1 match point for the loser

=== Tiebreakers ===
1. Number of matches won
2. Match points
3. Sets ratio
4. Points ratio
5. If the tie continues as per the point ratio between two teams, the priority is given to the team which won the match between them. When the tie in points ratio is between three or more teams, a new classification of these teams in the terms of points 1, 2, 3 and 4 is made taking into consideration only the matches in which they were opposed to each other.

=== Pool A ===
Pos	Team	Pld	W	L	Pts	SW	SL	SR	SPW	SPL	SPR	Qualification
1	Ukraine	5	5	0	15	15	1	15.000	403	282	1.429	Quarterfinals
2	Poland	5	4	1	12	12	6	2.000	412	358	1.151	Quarterfinals
3	Croatia	5	2	3	6	9	9	1.000	390	385	1.013	Quarterfinals
4	Turkey	5	2	3	6	8	10	0.800	396	396	1.000	Quarterfinals
5	Hungary (H)	5	1	4	3	4	13	0.308	313	405	0.773	
6	France	5	1	4	3	3	12	0.250	279	362	0.771	

Source: 2025 Sitting Volleyball European Championships
(H) Host

Date	Time		Score		Set 1	Set 2	Set 3	Set 4	Set 5	Total	Report
28 July	10:00	Poland	3–1	Turkey	25–17	21–25	25–21	25–22		96–85	Report
28 July	10:30	Croatia	1–3	Ukraine	28–26	15–25	25–27	17–25		85–103	Report
28 July	12:15	Hungary	0–3	France	16–25	23–25	23–25			62–75	Report
28 July	16:00	Poland	0–3	Ukraine	19–25	12–25	19–25			50–75	Report
28 July	18:00	Hungary	3–1	Turkey	19–25	25–23	25–17	25–20		94–85	Report
28 July	20:00	Croatia	3–0	France	25–18	25–17	25–13			75–48	Report
29 July	10:00	Hungary	0–3	Ukraine	16–25	15–25	18–25			49–75	Report
29 July	12:00	Croatia	1–3	Poland	18–25	21–25	25–21	19–25		83–96	Report
29 July	14:00	France	0–3	Turkey	18–25	22–25	19–25			59–75	Report
29 July	18:15	Hungary	1–3	Poland	16–25	25–20	14–25	11–25		66–95	Report
29 July	19:00	Croatia	1–3	Turkey	19–25	18–25	25–21	10–25		72–96	Report
30 July	12:15	Hungary	0–3	Croatia	19–25	16–25	7–25			42–75	Report
30 July	12:30	Ukraine	3–0	France	25–15	25–20	25–13			75–48	Report
30 July	18:15	Ukraine	3–0	Turkey	25–21	25–19	25–15			75–55	Report
30 July	19:00	Poland	3–0	France	25–19	25–19	25–11			75–49	Report

=== Pool B ===
Pos	Team	Pld	W	L	Pts	SW	SL	SR	SPW	SPL	SPR	Qualification
1	Bosnia and Herzegovina	5	5	0	15	15	0	MAX	375	220	1.705	Quarterfinals
2	Germany	5	4	1	12	12	3	4.000	355	262	1.355	Quarterfinals
3	Serbia	5	3	2	8	9	10	0.900	386	423	0.913	Quarterfinals
4	Netherlands	5	2	3	6	7	10	0.700	337	374	0.901	Quarterfinals
5	Latvia	5	1	4	2	5	14	0.357	379	436	0.869	
6	Italy	5	0	5	2	4	15	0.267	328	377	0.870	

Source: 2025 Sitting Volleyball European Championships

Date	Time		Score		Set 1	Set 2	Set 3	Set 4	Set 5	Total	Report
28 July	11:15	Germany	3–0	Latvia	25–14	25–19	25–21			75–54	Report
28 July	12:00	Bosnia and Herzegovina	3–0	Italy	25–7	25–18	25–16			75–41	Report
28 July	14:00	Serbia	3–1	Netherlands	26–24	25–15	14–25	25–21		90–85	Report
28 July	17:00	Bosnia and Herzegovina	3–0	Latvia	25–18	25–16	25–6			75–40	Report
28 July	19:00	Germany	3–0	Netherlands	25–10	25–13	25–18			75–41	Report
28 July	20:15	Serbia	3–2	Italy	24–26	25–19	21–25	25–14	15–13	110–97	Report
29 July	10:15	Bosnia and Herzegovina	3–0	Netherlands	25–17	25–13	25–14			75–44	Report
29 July	12:15	Germany	3–0	Serbia	25–20	25–18	25–8			75–46	Report
29 July	14:30	Latvia	3–2	Italy	21–25	25–15	24–26	25–22	15–6	110–94	Report
29 July	17:15	Bosnia and Herzegovina	3–0	Serbia	25–15	25–12	25–13			75–40	Report
30 July	10:00	Germany	3–0	Italy	25–14	25–13	25–19			75–46	Report
30 July	12:00	Netherlands	3–1	Latvia	26–24	16–25	25–20	25–15		92–84	Report
30 July	15:00	Bosnia and Herzegovina	3–0	Germany	25–17	25–20	25–18			75–55	Report
30 July	17:00	Netherlands	3–0	Italy	25–20	25–17	25–13			75–50	Report
30 July	18:00	Serbia	3–1	Latvia	23–25	25–23	25–18	27–25		100–91	Report

== Knockout stage ==
Quarterfinals
31 July
Ukraine	3
Netherlands	0
31 July
Germany	3
Croatia	0
31 July
Bosnia and Herzegovina	3
Turkey	0
31 July
Poland	2
Serbia	3

Semifinals
1 August
Ukraine	0
Germany	3
1 August
Bosnia and Herzegovina	3
Serbia	0

Final
2 August
Germany	3
Bosnia and Herzegovina	0
Third place
2 August
Ukraine	3
Serbia	0

=== Quarterfinals ===
Date	Time		Score		Set 1	Set 2	Set 3	Set 4	Set 5	Total	Report
31 July	16:00	Ukraine	3–0	Netherlands	25–23	27–25	25–17			77–65	Report
31 July	16:15	Poland	2–3	Serbia	25–21	24–26	25–15	19–25	15–17	108–104	Report
31 July	16:30	Bosnia and Herzegovina	3–0	Turkey	25–15	25–17	25–14			75–46	Report
31 July	18:15	Germany	3–0	Croatia	25–17	25–22	25–14			75–53	Report

=== Semifinals ===
Date	Time		Score		Set 1	Set 2	Set 3	Set 4	Set 5	Total	Report
1 August	16:15	Ukraine	0–3	Germany	15–25	22–25	16–25			53–75	Report
1 August	18:15	Bosnia and Herzegovina	3–0	Serbia	25–15	25–16	25–18			75–49	Report

=== Third place match ===
Date	Time		Score		Set 1	Set 2	Set 3	Set 4	Set 5	Total	Report
2 August	12:00	Ukraine	3–0	Serbia	25–19	25–21	25–17			75–57	Report

=== Final ===
Date	Time		Score		Set 1	Set 2	Set 3	Set 4	Set 5	Total	Report
2 August	16:00	Germany	0–3	Bosnia and Herzegovina	23–25	22–25	18–25			63–75	Report

=== 5–8 classification bracket ===
Semifinals
1 August
Netherlands	0
Croatia	3
1 August
Turkey	2
Poland	3

5th place match
2 August
Croatia	3
Poland	1
7th place match
2 August
Netherlands	2
Turkey	3

=== 5–8 Semifinals ===
Date	Time		Score		Set 1	Set 2	Set 3	Set 4	Set 5	Total	Report
1 August	16:00	Turkey	2–3	Poland	19–25	21–25	25–19	25–21	16–18	106–108	Report
1 August	16:30	Netherlands	0–3	Croatia	17–25	14–25	18–25			49–75	Report

=== Seventh place match ===
Date	Time		Score		Set 1	Set 2	Set 3	Set 4	Set 5	Total	Report
2 August	10:15	Netherlands	2–3	Turkey	25–21	25–18	18–25	21–25	6–15	95–104	Report

=== Fifth place match ===
Date	Time		Score		Set 1	Set 2	Set 3	Set 4	Set 5	Total	Report
2 August	10:30	Croatia	3–1	Poland	25–20	25–19	22–25	25–21		97–85	Report

=== 9–12th placement group ===
The four losers that failed to make the quarter finals all play each other in a four team group to decide the places 9–12. Games against the teams that have already played each other are carried over.

Pos	Team	Pld	W	L	Pts	SW	SL	SR	SPW	SPL	SPR	Qualification
1	Hungary (H)	3	2	1	6	6	5	1.200	260	251	1.036	Ninth place
2	Latvia	3	2	1	4	7	7	1.000	316	300	1.053	Tenth place
3	France	3	1	2	5	7	6	1.167	277	287	0.965	Eleventh place
4	Italy	3	1	2	3	6	8	0.750	286	304	0.941	Twelfth place

Source: Report
(H) Host

=== Matches ===
Date	Time		Score		Set 1	Set 2	Set 3	Set 4	Set 5	Total	Report
31 July	14:00	Latvia	3–2	France	22–25	21–25	25–20	31–29	15–8	114–107	Report
31 July	14:30	Hungary	3–1	Italy	25–16	25–20	24–26	25–19		99–81	Report
1 August	14:00	France	2–3	Italy	25–23	16–25	19–25	25–23	10–15	95–111	Report
1 August	14:30	Hungary	3–1	Latvia	24–26	25–21	25–23	25–22		99–92	Report

== Final rankings ==
The top three teams, Bosnia and Herzegovina, Germany and Ukraine qualified for the world championship. Serbia, Turkey and France achieved their best results, placing fourth, seventh and eleventh respectively.

Rank	Team
Gold medal	Bosnia and Herzegovina
Silver medal	Germany
Bronze medal	Ukraine
4	Serbia
5	Croatia
6	Poland
7	Turkey
8	Netherlands
9	Hungary
10	Latvia
11	France
12	Italy

Team Qualified for the 2026 Sitting Volleyball World Championships

== See also ==
- 2025 Sitting Volleyball European Championships – Women's event
