= 2025 Sitting Volleyball European Championships – Women's event =

Sitting volleyball tournament in Hungary

2025 Sitting Volleyball European Championships

Tournament details
- Host country: Hungary
- City: Győr
- Dates: 28 July – 2 August
- Teams: 9 (from 1 confederation)
- Venue: 1 (in 1 host city)

Final positions
- Champions: Italy (2nd title)
- Runners-up: Netherlands
- Third place: Ukraine
- Fourth place: Slovenia

Tournament statistics
- Matches played: 30

The 2025 Sitting Volleyball European Championships – Women's event was the 17th edition of the biannual continental championship, contested by the senior women's national sitting volleyball teams in Europe, sanctioned by ParaVolley Europe. It was held in Győr, Hungary from 28 July to 2 August 2025, marking the fourth time the event is held in the country.

Nine teams took part for the fourth time, one less than the previous edition.

The tournament acted as qualification for the 2026 Sitting Volleyball World Championships in Hangzhou, China, with three spots available.

Italy are the defending champions, after beating Slovenia 3–1 in the 2023 final in Caorle. Italy defended their title after beating Netherlands 3–0 in the final to win their second title.

== Host selection ==
On 4 September 2024, Budapest, Hungary was given the hosting rights. This marks the fourth time the country hosts the event, after 2001, 2007 and 2019.

=== Quotes ===
“In the last five years, we have witnessed a huge development in ParaVolley Europe, and the #EuroSittingVolley will be back to Budapest. We are in a new era of paravolley, and expect an even better event compared to the one held in the Hungarian capital six years ago, and that was already an excellent one.”

— Branko Mihorko, ParaVolley Europe president.

“Our country can not only be a good organiser again, but can also hope for a successful performance. The previous year was also good for our Sitting Volleyball players, the women's national team finished fifth in the European Championship, but the men also perform better and better every year. We are confident that the 2025 event will also promote their professional development. Furthermore, the Hungarian Volleyball Federation seized the chance to organise the event because believes in social responsibility, and considers it important that Sitting Volleyball and sport belong to everyone, and with this event also wants to draw attention to this matter,”

— Gabriella Vatai, Hungarian Volleyball Federation president.

=== Change of venue ===
On 19 February 2025, following a request by the original venue, the Ludovika University of Public Service in Budapest, to fulfil their purpose-specific obligations, the host city was changed from Budapest to Győr.

=== Preparations ===
- On 21 December 2024, the hosting contract was signed.
- On 12 June 2025, the competition website went live.

== Teams ==
Nine teams took part for the fourth time, one less than the previous edition. Netherlands are present after being absent in 2023. Great Britain and Turkey didn't participate after taking part in 2023.

Team	Appearance(s)					Previous best performance (Note: Bold text indicates they hosted that edition.)
Team	Total	First	Last	Streak	2023	Previous best performance
Croatia	7th	2013	2023	7	6th	Sixth place (2023)
France	2nd	2023		2	9th	Ninth place (2023)
Germany	15th	1995	2023	10	4th	Third place (2021)
Hungary (H)	8th	2011	2023	8	5th	Fifth place (2023)
Italy	5th	2017	2023	5	1st	Champions (2023)
Netherlands	15th	1993	2021	1	N/A	Champions (1993, 1995, 2001, 2003, 2005, 2007, 2009)
Poland	5th	2009	2023	3	7th	Seventh place (2023)
Slovenia	16th	1995	2023	16	2nd	Champions (1999)
Ukraine	15th	1995	2023	13	3rd	Champions (2011, 2015)

== Venue ==
The Olympic Sports Park in Győr was the venue. The complex hosted Athletics, Gymnastics, Judo and Tennis at the 2017 European Youth Summer Olympic Festival. This is the first time the city will hold the championship. Three separate courts were used at the arena.

2025 Sitting Volleyball European Championships – Women's event is located in Hungary	Győr
2025 Sitting Volleyball European Championships – Women's event is located in Hungary	Olympic Sports Park
2025 Sitting Volleyball European Championships – Women's event is located in Hungary	Capacity: Unknown

== Draw ==
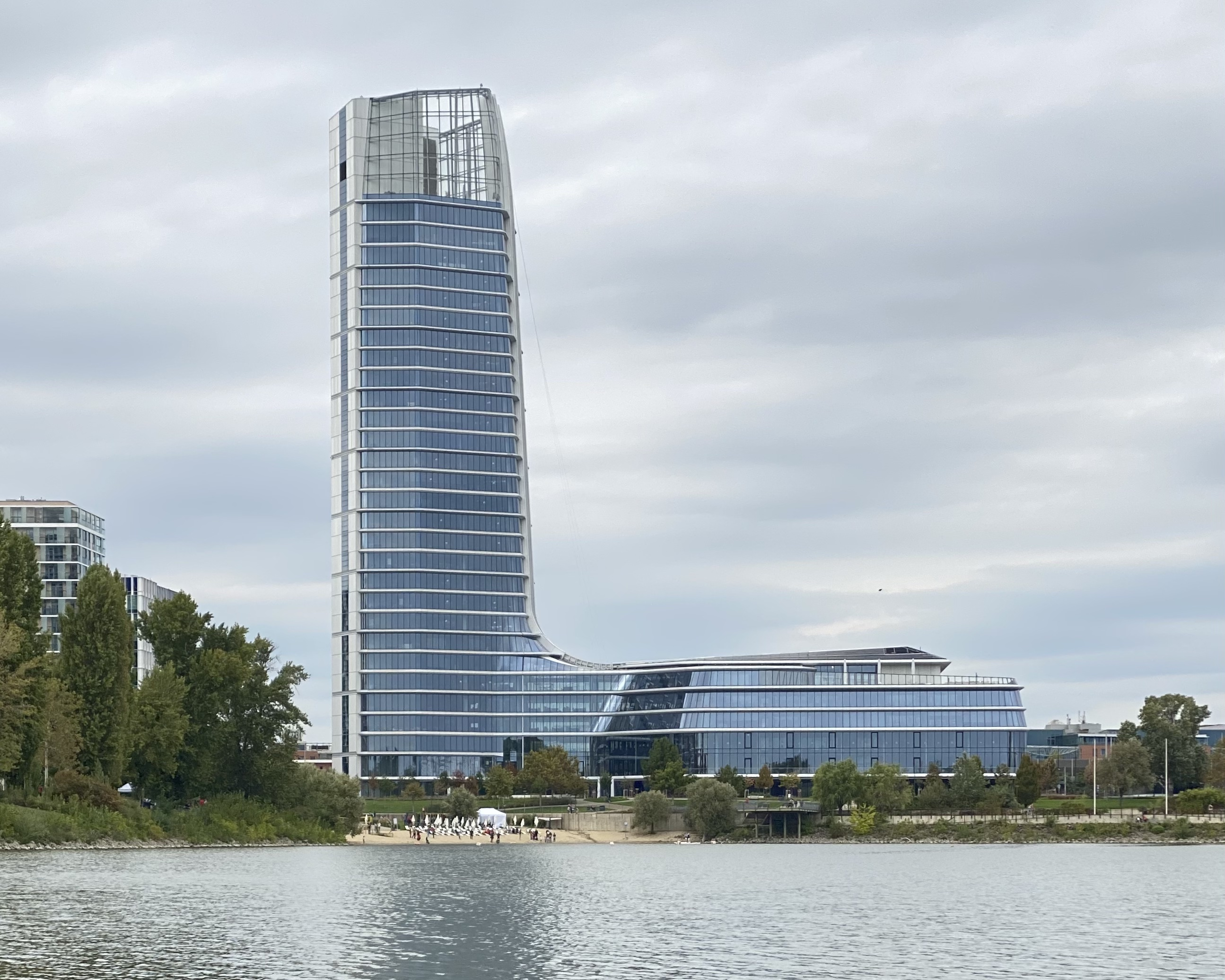
The MOL Campus in Budapest hosted the draw.

The draw was held at 14:00 CET on 19 May 2025 at the Virtu restaurant, on the 28th floor of the MOL Campus in Budapest, Hungary. The draw started with, in order, pots 1 and 2 being drawn, with each team selected then allocated into the first available group alphabetically. Hosts Hungary were pre-allocated into A1. The draw included a pot to decide which group had five teams.

=== Seeding ===
The seeding was based on the ParaVolley Europe rankings. Hungary was not in the pots as they were already pre-allocated into position A1.

Pot 1
Team
Italy
Slovenia
Germany
Ukraine

Pot 2
Team
Poland
Croatia
France
Netherlands

- 2025 Sitting Volleyball European Championships – Draw
- Draw Live Stream

=== Draw results ===
Group A
Pos	Team
A1	Hungary (H)
A2	Slovenia
A3	Ukraine
A4	Poland

Group B
Pos	Team
B1	Italy
B2	Germany
B3	France
B4	Netherlands
B5	Croatia

== Format ==
9 teams are split into two groups. The top four in each group plays in the Quarterfinals, the four losing quarterfinalists alongside the sole team not in the quarterfinals, play in the classification group.

== Opening ceremony ==
The opening ceremony took place on 27 July, a day before the tournament began. The opening ceremony contained a parade of nations and a performance from JP Dance Company.

== Group stage ==
- All times are local.
- The top four teams in each pool qualify for the knockout stage.
- Match won 3–0 or 3–1: 3 match points for the winner, 0 match points for the loser
- Match won 3–2: 2 match points for the winner, 1 match point for the loser

=== Tiebreakers ===
1. Number of matches won
2. Match points
3. Sets ratio
4. Points ratio
5. If the tie continues as per the point ratio between two teams, the priority is given to the team which won the match between them. When the tie in points ratio is between three or more teams, a new classification of these teams in the terms of points 1, 2, 3 and 4 is made taking into consideration only the matches in which they were opposed to each other.

=== Pool A ===
Pos	Team	Pld	W	L	Pts	SW	SL	SR	SPW	SPL	SPR	Qualification
1	Slovenia	3	3	0	8	9	2	4.500	250	180	1.389	Quarterfinals
2	Ukraine	3	2	1	7	8	3	2.667	248	175	1.417	Quarterfinals
3	Poland	3	1	2	3	3	6	0.500	165	190	0.868	Quarterfinals
4	Hungary (H)	3	0	3	0	0	9	0.000	107	225	0.476	Quarterfinals

Source: 2025 Sitting Volleyball European Championships
(H) Host

Date	Time		Score		Set 1	Set 2	Set 3	Set 4	Set 5	Total	Report
28 July	14:30	Slovenia	3–0	Poland	25–14	25–20	25–14			75–48	Report
28 July	16:15	Hungary	0–3	Ukraine	12–25	10–25	11–25			33–75	Report
29 July	14:15	Slovenia	3–2	Ukraine	25–18	13–25	22–25	25–21	15–9	100–98	Report
29 July	16:15	Hungary	0–3	Poland	14–25	10–25	16–25			40–75	Report
30 July	14:00	Ukraine	3–0	Poland	25–13	25–19	25–10			75–42	Report
30 July	14:15	Hungary	0–3	Slovenia	11–25	8–25	15–25			34–75	Report

=== Pool B ===
Pos	Team	Pld	W	L	Pts	SW	SL	SR	SPW	SPL	SPR	Qualification
1	Italy	4	4	0	12	12	0	MAX	302	146	2.068	Quarterfinals
2	Netherlands	4	3	1	9	9	3	3.000	268	227	1.181	Quarterfinals
3	Germany	4	2	2	6	6	7	0.857	283	217	1.304	Quarterfinals
4	France	4	1	3	3	4	10	0.400	212	319	0.665	Quarterfinals
5	Croatia	4	0	4	0	1	12	0.083	190	313	0.607	

Source: 2025 Sitting Volleyball European Championships

Date	Time		Score		Set 1	Set 2	Set 3	Set 4	Set 5	Total	Report
28 July	12:30	Italy	3–0	Croatia	25–13	25–4	25–10			75–27	Report
28 July	14:15	Germany	0–3	Netherlands	21–25	21–25	23–25			65–75	Report
28 July	18:15	France	3–1	Croatia	25–15	25–14	13–25	25–20		88–74	Report
29 July	10:30	Italy	3–0	Netherlands	25–13	25–16	25–14			75–43	Report
29 July	12:30	Germany	3–1	France	25–15	20–25	25–8	25–8		95–56	Report
29 July	16:00	Netherlands	3–0	Croatia	25–12	25–12	25–23			75–47	Report
30 July	10:15	Italy	3–0	France	25–5	25–13	25–10			75–28	Report
30 July	10:30	Germany	3–0	Croatia	25–16	25–13	25–13			75–42	Report
30 July	16:00	France	0–3	Netherlands	20–25	11–25	9–25			40–75	Report
30 July	16:15	Italy	3–0	Germany	25–14	25–9	27–25			77–48	Report

== Knockout stage ==
Quarterfinals
31 July
Slovenia	3
France	0
31 July
Netherlands	3
Poland	0
31 July
Italy	3
Germany	0
31 July
Ukraine	3
Hungary	0

Semifinals
1 August
Slovenia	2
Netherlands	3
1 August
Italy	3
Ukraine	0

Final
2 August
Netherlands	0
Italy	3
Third place
2 August
Slovenia	1
Ukraine	3

=== Quarterfinals ===
Date	Time		Score		Set 1	Set 2	Set 3	Set 4	Set 5	Total	Report
31 July	12:00	Slovenia	3–0	France	25–11	25–15	25–16			75–42	Report
31 July	12:15	Ukraine	3–0	Germany	25–19	25–16	25–16			75–51	Report
31 July	12:30	Italy	3–0	Hungary	25–7	25–9	25–12			75–28	Report
31 July	14:15	Netherlands	3–0	Poland	28–26	25–17	25–22			78–65	Report

=== Semifinals ===
Date	Time		Score		Set 1	Set 2	Set 3	Set 4	Set 5	Total	Report
1 August	12:15	Slovenia	2–3	Netherlands	25–14	25–18	22–25	23–25	14–16	109–98	Report
1 August	14:15	Ukraine	0–3	Italy	21–25	17–25	16–25			54–75	Report

=== Third place match ===
Date	Time		Score		Set 1	Set 2	Set 3	Set 4	Set 5	Total	Report
2 August	10:00	Slovenia	1–3	Ukraine	25–17	21–25	17–25	12–25		75–92	Report

=== Final ===
Date	Time		Score		Set 1	Set 2	Set 3	Set 4	Set 5	Total	Report
2 August	14:00	Netherlands	0–3	Italy	13–25	18–25	14–25			45–75	Report

=== 5–9th placement group ===
The four losers in the quarterfinals, alongside Croatia, all played each other in a five team group to decide the places 5–9. Games against the teams that have already played each other are carried over.

Pos	Team	Pld	W	L	Pts	SW	SL	SR	SPW	SPL	SPR	Qualification
5	Germany	4	4	0	12	12	1	12.000	320	178	1.798	Fifth place
6	Poland	4	3	1	9	9	4	2.250	296	223	1.327	Sixth place
7	Hungary (H)	4	2	2	6	6	6	1.000	227	271	0.838	Seventh place
8	France	4	1	3	3	3	10	0.300	242	319	0.759	Eighth place
9	Croatia	4	0	4	0	1	12	0.083	247	341	0.724	Ninth place

Source: 2025 Sitting Volleyball European Championships
(H) Host

Date	Time		Score		Set 1	Set 2	Set 3	Set 4	Set 5	Total	Report
31 July	18:00	Croatia	0–3	Hungary	24–26	20–25	16–25			60–76	Report
31 July	19:15	France	0–3	Poland	14–25	15–25	8–25			37–75	Report
1 August	12:00	Germany	3–0	Hungary	25–17	25–15	25–4			75–36	Report
1 August	12:30	Croatia	1–3	Poland	19–25	29–27	10–25	13–25		71–102	Report
1 August	18:00	France	0–3	Hungary	20–25	22–25	19–25			61–75	Report
1 August	18:30	Germany	3–0	Poland	25–22	25–7	25–15			75–44	Report

== Final rankings ==
The top three teams, Italy, Netherlands and Ukraine qualified for the world championship. Poland and France achieved their best result, placing sixth and eighth respectively.

Rank	Team
Gold medal	Italy
Silver medal	Netherlands
Bronze medal	Ukraine
4	Slovenia
5	Germany
6	Poland
7	Hungary
8	France
9	Croatia

Team Qualified for the 2026 Sitting Volleyball World Championships

== See also ==
- 2025 Sitting Volleyball European Championships – Men's event
