= Women's European Sitting Volleyball Championships =

European women's sitting volleyball competition for national teams

- Upcoming season or competition: 2025 Sitting Volleyball European Championships – Women's event
- Sport: Volleyball
- Founded: 1993; 33 years ago
- First season: 1993
- No. of teams: 9 (Finals)
- Continent: Europe (ParaVolley Europe)
- Most recent champions: Italy (2nd title)
- Most titles: Netherlands (8 titles)
- Website: ParaVolley Europe Youtube channel

The Women's European Sitting Volleyball Championships is an international sitting volleyball competition contested by the senior women's national teams of the members of ParaVolley Europe (PVE), the sport's European governing body. From the start, the event has been held biannually, since the inaugural edition in 1993.

The current champions are the Italy, which won their second title at the 2025 tournament in Győr, Hungary.

== History ==
While the men's tournament started in 1981, it took twelve years to introduce a women's equivalent. In 1993, the first edition was held in Järvenpää, Finland, where four teams took part. Netherlands won the first edition, with hosts Finland coming second. Since then, the event has been consistently held every two years.

The most successful team in the tournament is Netherlands with eight titles.

== Results summary ==
Year	Host	Final			3rd place match		Teams
Year	Host	Champions	Score	Runners-up	3rd place	4th place	Teams
1993	(Finland) Järvenpää	Netherlands	3–2	Finland	Estonia	Latvia	4
1995	(Slovenia) Ljubljana	Netherlands	3–0	Latvia	Slovenia	Lithuania	8
1997	(Estonia) Tallinn	Latvia	–	Lithuania	Netherlands	Slovenia	8
1999	(Bosnia and Herzegovina) Sarajevo	Slovenia	–	Finland	Netherlands	Latvia	6
2001	(Hungary) Sárospatak	Netherlands	3–1	Slovenia	Finland	Ukraine	7
2003	(Finland) Lappeenranta	Netherlands	3–0	Slovenia	Finland	Ukraine	7
2005	(Germany) Leverkusen	Netherlands	–	Lithuania	Slovenia	Ukraine	5
2007	(Hungary) Nyíregyháza	Netherlands	3–1	Ukraine	Slovenia	Lithuania	7
2009	(Poland) Elbląg	Netherlands	3–1	Ukraine	Slovenia	Lithuania	8
2011	(Netherlands) Rotterdam	Ukraine	3–1	Netherlands	Russia	Slovenia	8
2013	(Poland) Elbląg	Russia	3–2	Ukraine	Slovenia	Netherlands	9
2015	(Slovenia) Podčetrtek	Ukraine	3–2	Russia	Slovenia	Netherlands	8
2017	(Croatia) Poreč	Russia	3–0	Ukraine	Netherlands	Finland	9
2019	(Hungary) Budapest	Russia	3–0	Italy	Ukraine	Germany	9
2021	(Turkey) Antalya	Russia	3–1	Italy	Germany	Slovenia	11
2023	(Italy) Caorle	Italy	3–1	Slovenia	Ukraine	Germany	10
2025	(Hungary) Gyor	Italy	3–0	Netherlands	Ukraine	Slovenia	9

== Medals summary ==
Rank	Nation	Gold	Silver	Bronze	Total
1	Netherlands	7	2	3	12
2	Russia	4	1	1	6
3	Ukraine	2	4	3	9
4	Italy	2	2	0	4
5	Slovenia	1	3	6	10
6	Latvia	1	1	0	2
7	Finland	0	2	2	4
8	Lithuania	0	2	0	2
9	Estonia	0	0	1	1
9	Germany	0	0	1	1
Totals (10 entries)		17	17	17	51

== Participating nations ==
Legend

- 1st – Champions
- 2nd – Runners-up
- 3rd – Third place
- 4th – Fourth place
- 5th – Fifth place
- 6th – Sixth place
- 7th – Seventh place
- 8th – Eighth place
- 9th – Ninth place
- 10th – Tenth place
- 11th – Eleventh place
- 12th – Twelfth place
- Q – Qualified for upcoming tournament
- q – may still qualify for upcoming tournament
- • – Did not qualify
- •× – Disqualified
- × – Did not enter / Withdrew / Banned
- – Hosts

For each tournament, the number of teams in each finals tournament (in brackets) are shown.

Nation	(Finland) 1993	(Slovenia) 1995	(Estonia) 1997	(Bosnia and Herzegovina) 1999	(Hungary) 2001	(Finland) 2003	(Germany) 2005	(Hungary) 2007	(Poland) 2009	(Netherlands) 2011	(Poland) 2013	(Slovenia) 2015	(Croatia) 2017	(Hungary) 2019	(Turkey) 2021	(Italy) 2023	(Hungary) 2025	Participations
Croatia	×	×	×	×	×	×	×	×	×	×	9th	8th	9th	7th	9th	6th	9th	7
Estonia	3rd	×	8th	×	×	×	×	×	×	×	×	×	×	×	×	×	x	2
Finland	2nd	5th	5th	2nd	3rd	3rd	×	×	7th	6th	6th	6th	4th	6th	5rd	×	x	14
France	×	×	×	×	×	×	×	×	×	×	×	×	×	×	×	9th	8th	2
Great Britain	x	×	×	×	×	×	×	×	×	7th	×	×	×	9th	×	8th	x	3
Germany	×	8th	7th	6th	6th	6th	×	6th	5th	5th	5th	5th	8th	4th	3rd	4th	5th	15
Hungary	×	×	×	×	×	×	×	×	×	8th	7th	7th	6th	8th	7th	5th	7th	8
Italy	×	×	×	×	×	×	×	×	×	×	×	×	7th	2nd	2nd	1st	1st	5
Latvia	4th	2nd	1st	4th	7th	×	×	5th	×	×	×	×	×	×	×	×	x	6
Lithuania	×	4th	2nd	5th	5th	5th	2nd	4th	4th	×	×	×	×	×	×	x	x	8
Netherlands	1st	1st	3rd	3rd	1st	1st	1st	1st	1st	2nd	4th	4th	3rd	×	10th	x	2nd	15
Poland	×	×	×	×	×	×	×	×	8th	×	8th	×	×	×	8th	7th	6th	5
Russia	×	6th	×	×	×	7th	5th	7th	6th	3rd	1st	2nd	1st	1st	1st	x	x	11
Slovenia	×	3rd	4th	1st	2nd	2nd	3rd	3rd	3rd	4th	3rd	3rd	5th	5th	4th	2nd	4th	16
Turkey	×	×	×	×	×	×	×	×	×	×	×	×	×	×	11th	10th	x	2
Ukraine	×	7th	6th	×	4th	4th	4th	2nd	2nd	1st	2nd	1st	2nd	3rd	6th	3rd	3rd	15
Total	4	8	8	6	7	7	5	7	8	8	9	8	9	9	11	10	9	

== Hosts ==
List of hosts by number of championships hosted.

Total	Nations	Year(s)
4	Hungary	2001, 2007, 2019, 2025
2	Finland	1993, 2003
2	Poland	2009, 2013
2	Slovenia	1995, 2015
1	Bosnia and Herzegovina	1999
1	Croatia	2017
1	Estonia	1997
1	Germany	2005
1	Italy	2023
1	Netherlands	2011
1	Turkey	2021

== See also ==
- Volleyball at the Summer Paralympics
- World Para Volleyball Championship
- Sitting volleyball
- Men's European Sitting Volleyball Championships
- Asian Para Volleyball Championship (Asia Oceania Zone)
- African Para Volleyball Championship (Africa Zone )
- Pan American Para Volleyball Championship (America Zone)
- Euro League Club Championship
