= Men's European Sitting Volleyball Championships =

European men's sitting volleyball competition for national teams

- Upcoming season or competition: 2025 Sitting Volleyball European Championships – Men's event
- Sport: Volleyball
- Founded: 1981; 45 years ago
- First season: 1981
- No. of teams: 12 (Finals)
- Continent: Europe (ParaVolley Europe)
- Most recent champions: Bosnia and Herzegovina (12th title)
- Most titles: Bosnia and Herzegovina (12 titles)
- Website: ParaVolley Europe Youtube channel

The Men's European Sitting Volleyball Championships is an international sitting volleyball competition contested by the senior men's national teams of the members of ParaVolley Europe (PVE), the sport's European governing body. From the start, the event has been held biannually, since the inaugural edition in 1981.

The current champions are the Bosnia and Herzegovina, which won their twelfth title at the 2025 tournament in Győr, Hungary.

== History ==
The men's tournament started in 1981 Bonn, Germany, where ten teams took part. Netherlands won the first edition, with hosts West Germany coming second. Since then, the event has been consistently held every two years.

The most successful team in the tournament is Bosnia and Herzegovina with twelve titles.

== Results summary ==
Year	Host	Final			3rd place match		Teams
Year	Host	Champions	Score	Runners-up	3rd place	4th place	Teams
1981	(Germany) Bonn	Netherlands	3–2	West Germany	Sweden	Finland	10
1983	(Netherlands) Delden	Netherlands	3–2	West Germany	Finland	Sweden	9
1985	(Norway) Kristiansand	Netherlands	–	Yugoslavia	Sweden	Norway	10
1987	(Socialist Federal Republic of Yugoslavia) Sarajevo	Netherlands	3–2	Yugoslavia	Norway	Hungary	13
1989	Not held	Not held			Not held		Not held
1991	(United Kingdom) Nottingham	Netherlands	3–1	Hungary	Norway	Germany	9
1993	(Finland) Järvenpää	Norway	–	Finland	Hungary	Germany	12
1995	(Slovenia) Ljubljana	Hungary	–	Norway	Netherlands	Finland	12
1997	(Estonia) Tallinn	Finland	–	Norway	Bosnia and Herzegovina	Netherlands	12
1999	(Bosnia and Herzegovina) Sarajevo	Bosnia and Herzegovina	–	Germany	Finland	Netherlands	12
2001	(Hungary) Sárospatak	Bosnia and Herzegovina	–	Germany	Netherlands	Hungary	10
2003	(Finland) Lappeenranta	Bosnia and Herzegovina	–	Germany	Finland	Netherlands	12
2005	(Germany) Leverkusen	Bosnia and Herzegovina	–	Germany	Russia	Croatia	12
2007	(Hungary) Nyíregyháza	Bosnia and Herzegovina	–	Russia	Germany	Hungary	12
2009	(Poland) Elbląg	Bosnia and Herzegovina	3–1	Russia	Germany	Ukraine	11
2011	(Netherlands) Rotterdam	Bosnia and Herzegovina	3–1	Russia	Germany	Ukraine	11
2013	(Poland) Elbląg	Bosnia and Herzegovina	3–0	Russia	Germany	Ukraine	13
2015	(Germany) Warendorf	Bosnia and Herzegovina	3–0	Germany	Russia	Ukraine	12
2017	(Croatia) Poreč	Russia	3–0	Ukraine	Bosnia and Herzegovina	Croatia	13
2019	(Hungary) Budapest	Russia	3–2	Bosnia and Herzegovina	Germany	Ukraine	12
2021	(Turkey) Antalya	Bosnia and Herzegovina	3–0	Russia	Germany	Ukraine	16
2023	(Italy) Caorle	Bosnia and Herzegovina	3–2	Germany	Ukraine	Poland	12
2025	(Hungary) Gyor	Bosnia and Herzegovina	3–0	Germany	Ukraine	Serbia	12

== Medals summary ==
Rank	Nation	Gold	Silver	Bronze	Total
1	Bosnia and Herzegovina	12	1	2	15
2	Netherlands	5	0	2	7
3	Russia	2	5	2	9
4	Norway	1	2	2	5
5	Finland	1	1	3	5
6	Hungary	1	1	1	3
7	Germany	0	9	6	15
8	Yugoslavia	0	2	0	2
9	Ukraine	0	1	2	3
10	Sweden	0	0	2	2
Totals (10 entries)		22	22	22	66

== Participating nations ==
Legend

- 1st – Champions
- 2nd – Runners-up
- 3rd – Third place
- 4th – Fourth place
- 5th – Fifth place
- 6th – Sixth place
- 7th – Seventh place
- 8th – Eighth place
- 9th – Ninth place
- 10th – Tenth place
- 11th – Eleventh place
- 12th – Twelfth place
- Q – Qualified for upcoming tournament
- q – may still qualify for upcoming tournament
- • – Did not qualify
- •× – Disqualified
- × – Did not enter / Withdrew / Banned
- – Hosts

For each tournament, the number of teams in each finals tournament (in brackets) are shown.

Nation	(Germany) 1981	(Netherlands) 1983	(Norway) 1985	(Socialist Federal Republic of Yugoslavia) 1987	(United Kingdom) 1991	(Finland) 1993	(Slovenia) 1995	(Estonia) 1997	(Bosnia and Herzegovina) 1999	(Hungary) 2001	(Finland) 2003	(Germany) 2005	(Hungary) 2007	(Poland) 2009	(Netherlands) 2011	(Poland) 2013	(Germany) 2015	(Croatia) 2017	(Hungary) 2019	(Turkey) 2021	(Italy) 2023	(Hungary) 2025	Participations
Austria	8th	8th	8th	8th	×	10th	×	×	×	×	×	×	×	×	×	×	×	×	×	×	×	x	5
Azerbaijan						3rd	×	8th	×	×	×	×	×	×	11th	13th	7th	×	×	×	×	x	3
Belgium	7th	×	×	×	×	×	×	×	×	×	×	×	×	×	×	×	×	×	×	×	×	x	1
Bosnia and Herzegovina						×	11th	3rd	1st	1st	1st	1st	1st	1st	1st	1st	1st	3rd	2nd	1st	1st	1st	16
Belarus						x	×	10th	×	×	×	×	×	×	×	×	×	×	×	×	×	x	1
Croatia						11th	10th	9th	7th	9th	9th	4th	6th	7th	8th	7th	8th	4th	5th	6th	5th	5th	17
Czech Republic						×	×	×	×	×	×	×	×	×	×	×	×	×	×	15th	x	x	1
Denmark	9th	9th	10th	×	8th	×	×	×	×	×	×	×	×	×	×	×	×	×	×	×	×	x	4
Estonia						7th	12th	11th	x	x	11th	×	x	×	×	×	×	×	×	×	×	x	4
Finland	4th	3rd	7th	7th	5th	2nd	4th	1st	3rd	5th	3rd	6th	x	x	×	×	×	×	×	×	x	x	12
France	×	×	×	×	×	×	×	×	×	×	×	×	×	×	×	×	×	×	×	15th	x	11th	2
West Germany	2nd	2nd	6th	5th																			4
Great Britain	×	×	9th	10th	9th	×	×	×	×	×	x	x	12th	10th	9th	8th	×	×	×	×	x	x	7
Germany					4th	4th	5th	5th	2nd	2nd	2nd	2nd	3rd	3rd	3rd	3rd	2nd	5th	3rd	3rd	2nd	2nd	18
Georgia						×	×	×	×	×	×	×	×	×	×	×	×	13th	×	14th	x	x	2
Greece	×	×	×	×	×	×	×	×	×	×	12th	12th	11th	11th	×	×	×	×	×	×	×	x	4
Hungary	×	7th	5th	4th	2nd	3rd	1st	×	5th	4th	10th	5th	4th	6th	×	10th	10th	11th	12th	11th	9th	9th	19
Italy	×	×	×	×	×	×	×	×	×	×	×	×	×	×	×	×	12th	12th	×	13th	8th	12th	5
Latvia						12th	x	8th	12th	10th	8th	11th	8th	x	10th	11th	11th	9th	7th	10th	6th	10th	15
Lithuania						×	×	12	×	×	×	×	×	×	×	12th	×	×	10th	×	11th	x	4
Luxembourg	10th	×	×	×	×	x	×	×	×	×	×	×	×	×	×	×	×	×	×	×	×	x	1
Netherlands	1st	1st	1st	1st	1st	5th	3rd	4th	4th	3rd	6th	7th	9th	8th	5th	5th	5th	6th	8th	8th	x	8th	21
Norway	6th	6th	4th	3rd	3rd	1st	2nd	2nd	9th	×	×	×	×	×	×	×	×	×	×	×	×	×	9
Poland	×	×	×	×	×	×	×	×	11th	7th	5th	9th	10th	9th	6th	6th	6th	8th	11th	7th	4th	6th	14
Russia	×	×	×	×	7th	x	8th	x	10th	x	4th	3rd	2nd	2nd	2nd	2nd	3rd	1st	1st	2nd	×	x	13
Slovenia						6th	7th	6th	8th	8th	5th	×	×	×	×	×	×	×	×	12th	12th	x	7
Serbia												8th	7th	5th	7th	9th	9th	7th	6th	5th	7th	4th	11
Switzerland	×	×	×	9th	×	×	×	×	×	×	×	×	×	×	×	×	×	×	×	×	×	x	1
Sweden	3rd	4th	3rd	6th	6th	8th	6th	×	×	×	×	×	×	×	×	×	×	×	×	×	×	×	7
Turkey	×	×	×	×	×	×	×	×	×	×	×	×	×	×	×	×	×	10th	9th	9th	10th	7th	5
Ukraine						9th	9th	7th	6th	6th	7th	10th	5th	4th	4th	4th	4th	2nd	4th	4th	3rd	3rd	17
Yugoslavia	5th	5th	2nd	2nd	×	×	x	x	×	x													4
Total	10	9	10	13	9	12	12	12	12	10	12	12	12	11	11	13	12	13	12	16	12	12	

== Hosts ==
List of hosts by number of championships hosted.

Total	Nations	Year(s)
4	Hungary	2001, 2007, 2019, 2025
3	Germany	1981, 2005, 2015
2	Finland	1993, 2003
2	Netherlands	1983, 2011
2	Poland	2009, 2013
1	Bosnia and Herzegovina	1999
1	Croatia	2017
1	Estonia	1997
1	United Kingdom	1991
1	Italy	2023
1	Norway	1985
1	Slovenia	1995
1	Turkey	2021
1	Yugoslavia	1987

== See also ==
- Volleyball at the Summer Paralympics
- World Para Volleyball Championship
- Sitting volleyball
- Women's European Sitting Volleyball Championships
- Asian Para Volleyball Championship (Asia Oceania Zone)
- African Para Volleyball Championship (Africa Zone )
- Pan American Para Volleyball Championship (America Zone)
- Euro League Club Championship
