= Caorle Lighthouse =

Lighthouse in Veneto, Italy

Caorle
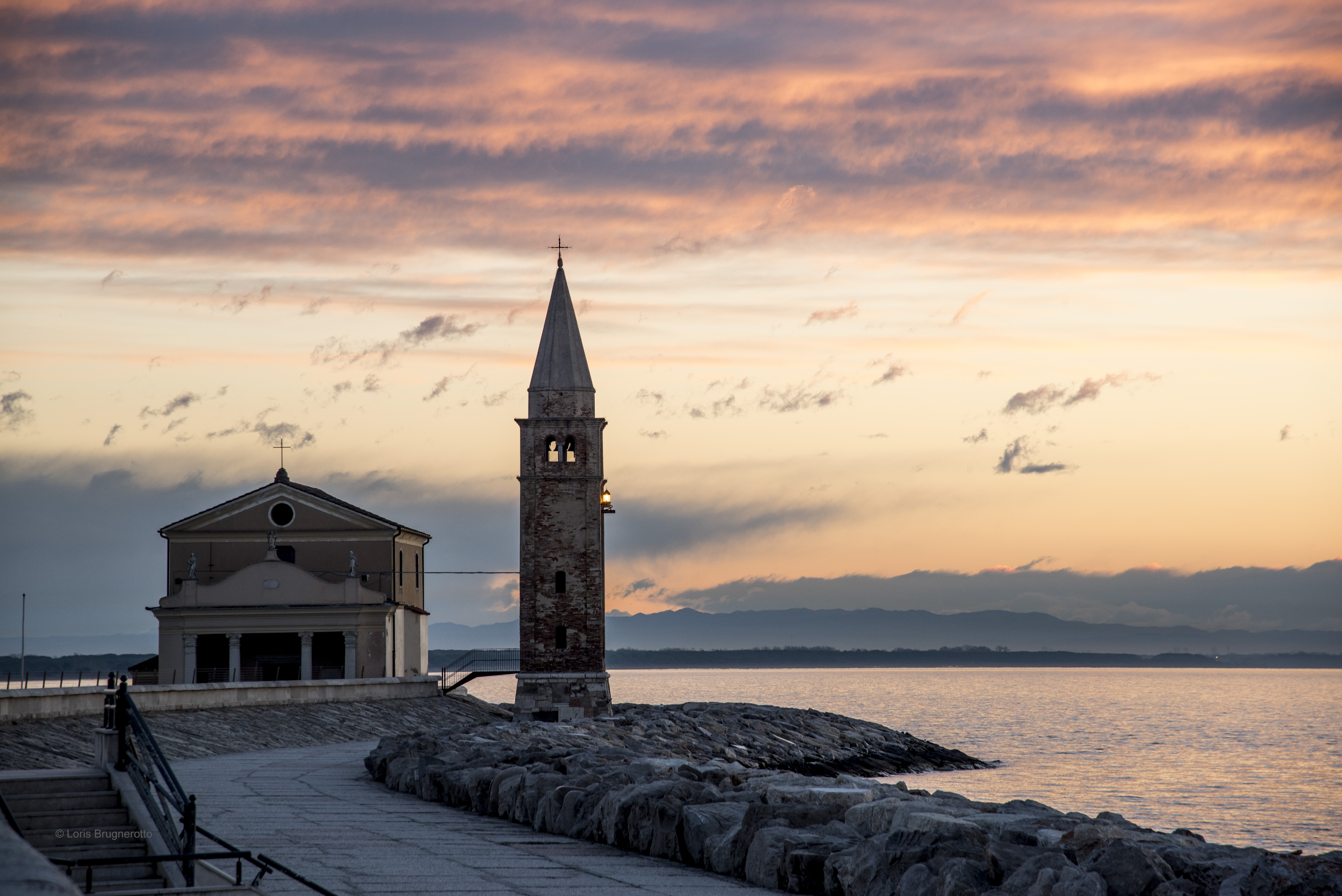
- Caorle Lighthouse
- Location: Caorle; Veneto; Italy
- Coordinates: 45°36′00″N 12°53′35″E

Tower
- Constructed: Unknown
- Foundation: masonry base
- Construction: masonry tower
- Height: 9 metres (30 ft)
- Shape: quadrangular bell tower with octagonal steeple, lantern atop a bracket on the south side
- Markings: unpainted brick tower
- Power source: mains electricity
- Operator: Marina Militare

Light
- First lit: 1905
- Focal height: 12 metres (39 ft)
- Lens: Type TD 300; Focal length: 150 mm
- Intensity: main: AL 1000 w reserve. LABI 100 W
- Range: main: 14 nautical miles (26 km; 16 mi) reserve: 10 nautical miles (19 km; 12 mi)
- Characteristic: Fl (2) W 6s.
- Italy no.: 4272 E.F

Caorle Lighthouse (Italian: Faro di Caorle) is an active lighthouse located on a little promontory at the end of the waterfront promenade in Caorle, Veneto on the Adriatic Sea.

== Description ==
The lighthouse consists of a quadrangular bell tower, 9 metres (30 ft) high, belonging to the Church of the Blessed Virgin of the Angel, and the light is placed on a bracket on the sea side of the tower.

The tower was built in bricks in Romanesque architecture; the light is positioned at 12 metres (39 ft) above sea level and emits two white flashes in a 6 seconds period, visible up to a distance of 14 nautical miles (26 km; 16 mi). The lighthouse is completely automated and managed by the Marina Militare with the identification code number 4272 E.F.

== History ==
The date of the lighthouse's construction is unknown, however a cult dedicated to the Archangel Michael was known to worship in the cathedral nearby, which is dated 1803. The bell tower of the cathedral, which is the modern lighthouse, is usually dated back to the 13th century.

In 1600, Domenico Minio condemned the condition of the bell tower, and ordered it to undergo renovations. During these renovations, a worker inscribed "ANTONIO ROGIO FECITANNO DOMINI LI VI LVGIO MD" on the base of the tower, along with a small cross. The tower again underwent restoration work in 1751, with Bishop Francesco Suarez being buried right at the foot of the main altar near the bell tower.

The light was first lit in 1905. The tower also houses three bells, with two made in 1919 and the other in 1926.

== See also ==
- List of lighthouses in Italy
