= MOL Campus =

Building in Budapest, Hungary

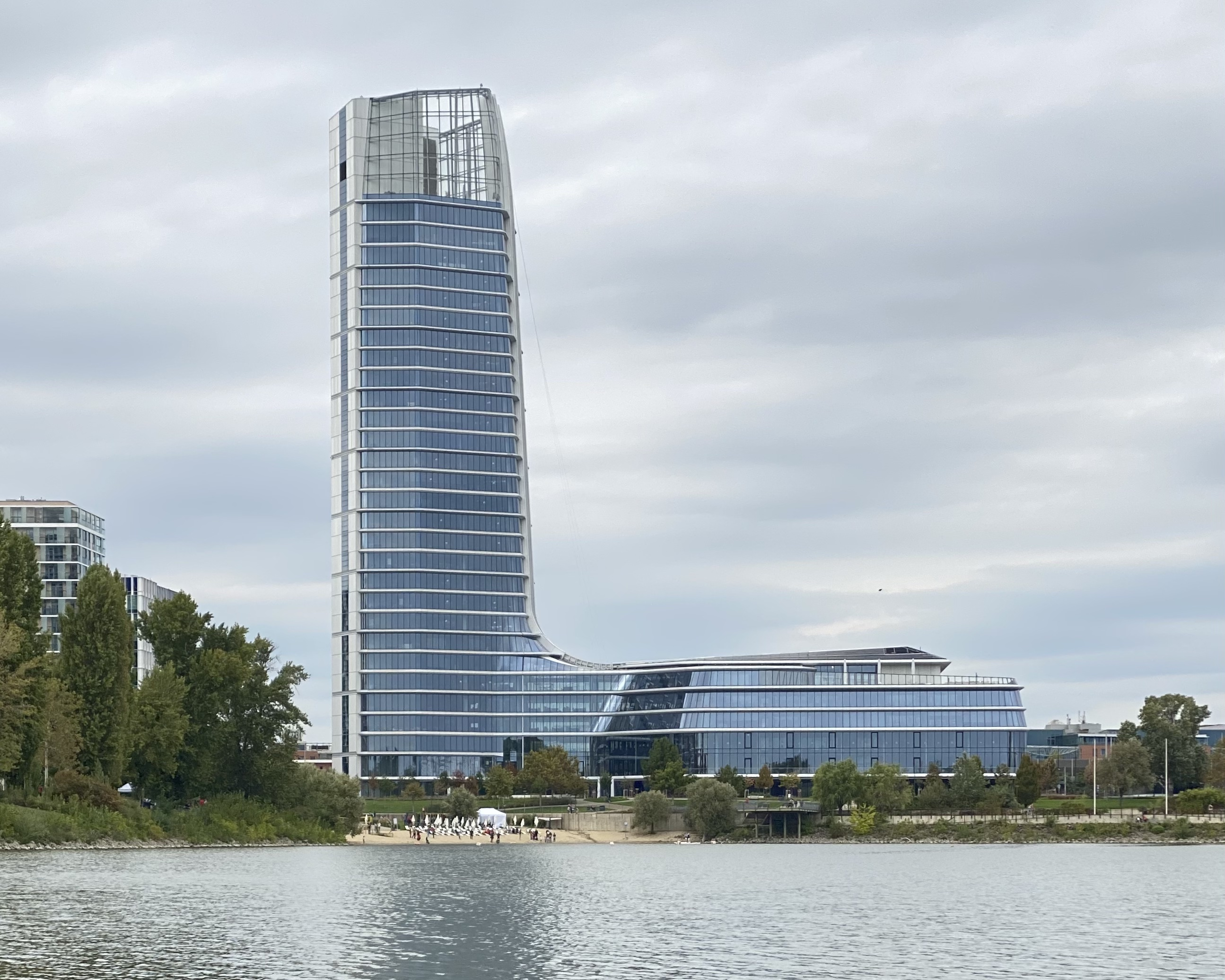
- MOL Campus Tower

General information
- Type: Office
- Architectural style: Neomodern
- Location: Budapest, Hungary
- Coordinates: 47°28′04″N 19°03′35″E
- Construction started: 2019
- Opened: 8 December 2022

Height
- Architectural: 143 m (469 ft)
- Roof: 143 m (469 ft)
- Observatory: 120 m (394 ft)

Technical details
- Floor count: 28
- Floor area: 86,000 m^{2} (930,000 sq ft)

Design and construction
- Architects: Foster + Partners, FintaStudio
- Developer: MOL Group

Website
- molcampus.hu/en/

MOL Campus is a neomodern skyscraper and the headquarters of MOL Group in Budapest, Hungary, designed by Foster and Partners. The tower is the tallest building in Budapest and in Hungary. Construction began in 2019 and was completed in 2022. It was officially inaugurated on 8 December 2022.

== Design ==
The building was designed by Foster + Partners together with the Hungarian Finta Studio. A 28-storey tower and a lower podium are joined in a single building. The tower is 143 metres (469 ft) tall, or 247 metres (810 ft) above sea level, and the building has a net floor area of 86,000 square metres (926,000 sq ft). A public observation deck is on the 29th floor, and the building also contains a visitor centre and two restaurants.

The campus stands in the BudaPart development on the Buda bank of the Danube, next to the Kopaszi Dam. About 2,500 MOL employees moved into it from offices across Budapest. Its energy systems include 900 square metres (9,700 sq ft) of solar panels, geothermal heating and cooling, grey-water recycling and rainwater harvesting, and MOL aimed for BREEAM Excellent and LEED Platinum certification.
