= Caorle =

Caorle Càorle (Venetian)
- Comune
- Comune di Caorle
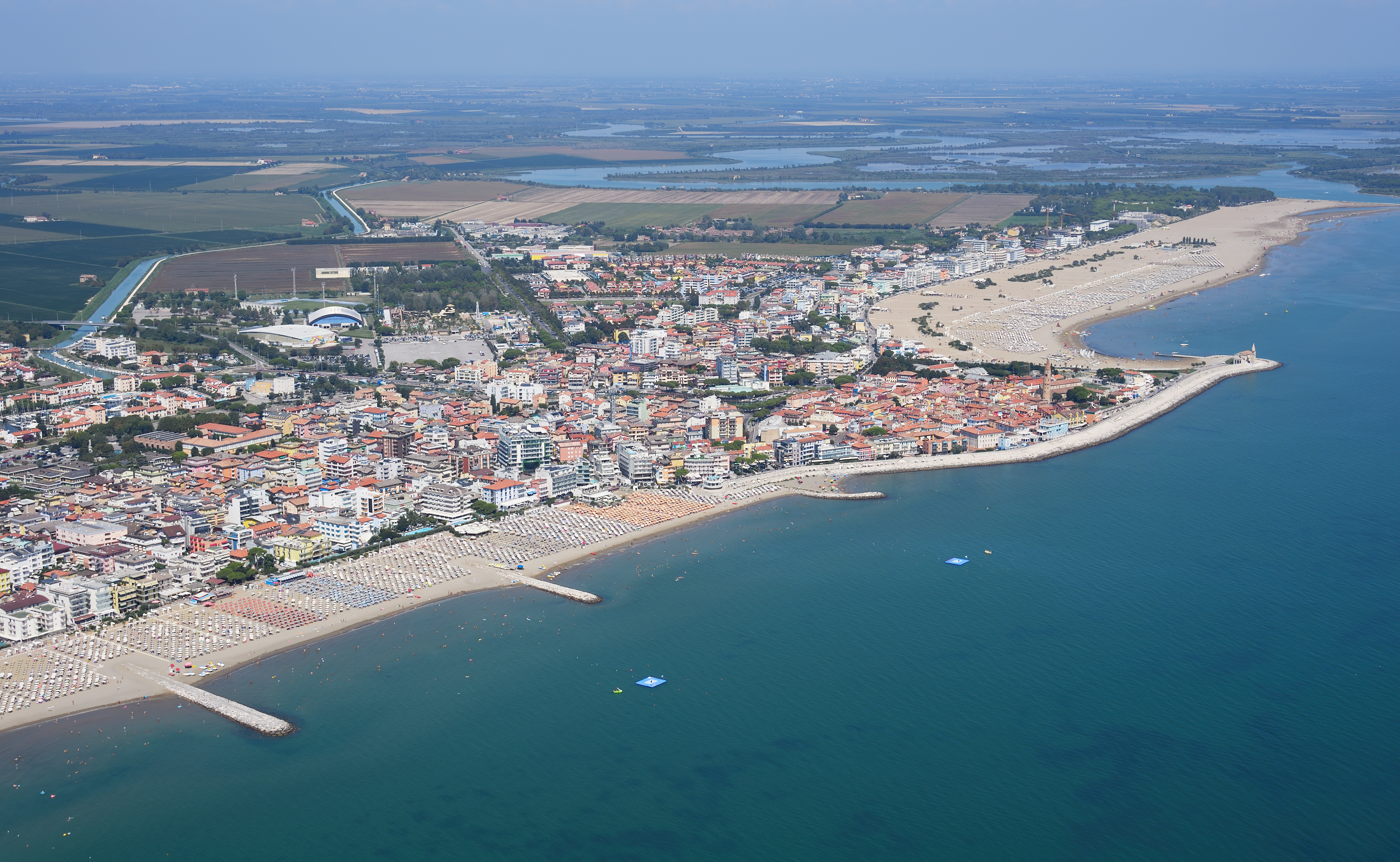

- Coat of arms

- Location within Italy Location within Veneto
- Coordinates: 45°36′N 12°53′E
- Country: Italy
- Region: Veneto
- Metropolitan city: Venice (VE)
- Frazioni: Porto Santa Margherita, Duna Verde, Ca' Corniani, Ca' Cottoni, San Giorgio di Livenza, San Gaetano, Brian, Brussa, Castello di Brussa, Ottava Presa, Marango, Villaviera

Government
  - Mayor: Marco Sarto

Area
  - Total: 153.84 km^{2} (59.40 sq mi)
- Elevation: 1 m (3.3 ft)

Population (31 December 2017)
  - Total: 11,606
  - Density: 75.442/km^{2} (195.39/sq mi)
- Demonym: Caprulani or Caorlotti
- Time zone: UTC+1 (CET)
  - Summer (DST): UTC+2 (CEST)
- Postal code: 30021
- Dialing code: 0421
- Patron saint: St. Stephen
- Saint day: December 26
- Website: Official website

Caorle (Italian pronunciation: [ˈkaːorle]; Venetian: Càorle) is a coastal town in the Metropolitan City of Venice, Veneto, northern Italy, located between the estuaries of the Livenza and Lemene rivers. It is situated on the Adriatic Sea between two other tourist towns, Eraclea and Bibione.

== History ==
A panoramic view of Caorle, 2018

The ancient name of the city was Caprulae (possibly because of the wild goats that grazed in this area, or in honour of pagan goddess Capris); Caorle was founded in the 1st century BC by Romans. Many archeological findings confirm this attribution, for instance the sacrificial altar called Ara Licovia (Licovian Altar, from the Roman Licovi family), today housed in the cathedral. A safe zone between the estuaries of the Livenza (Latin: Liquentia) and Lemene (Latin: Romantinum) rivers, Caorle gained importance when people from Concordia Sagittaria arrived as refugees during the Barbarian Invasions. In that period a Paleo-Christian church was built, some remains of which are today kept in the cathedral's museum. In the 11th century the cathedral was built, which still stands today. It was once the seat of a bishopric. During the following centuries, Caorle became one of the nine important cities of the Republic of Venice; evidence to that effect are the many Istrian flagstones which compose some monuments in the city, and also the ancient structure of the city with bridge and canals, like a little Venice. At the end of the Republic of Venice, with the Napoleonic invasions, Caorle went into decline; the last diocesan bishop of the diocese was moved in 1807 to Chioggia and the territory of the diocese was attached in 1818 to the Patriarchate of Venice. No longer a residential bishopric, Caorle/Caprulae is today listed by the Catholic Church as a titular see.

Caorle was an important strategic location during World War I, until the Italian Army started its counteroffensive from the Piave.

== Territory ==
Since the beginning of the 20th century the territory around Caorle has been deeply modified. Most of the woods of the "Selva Lupanica" were cut to give room to fields for cultivation, rivers were embanked, and marshes were reclaimed. This brought a landscape of wide flat areas, with no trees even along the rivers course. Along the coast, sedimentation and erosion constantly modify the scenery.

The landscape is still rather wild, with changing sandbanks and the fishing valleys.

== Main sights ==
=== Cathedral ===
The Cathedral of St. Stephen was built in 1038, an example of Romanesque and of the Byzantine-Ravennate style. Its façade is simple; near the central door there are two bas-reliefs (St. Agatonicus on the left, St. William on the right); the interior is organized with a nave and two side aisles, divided by pillars and columns which support semi-circular arches, and it has a truss-beam roof. It contains many masterpieces of the Venetian school of art, the most important of which is The Last Supper, painted by Gregorio Lazzarini (master of famous painter Tiepolo). The central apse has the remains of a 17th-century fresco; above the see there is the "Pala d'oro" (golden altar-piece), given by the queen Catherine Cornaro when, after a shipwreck, she found refuge in the Caprulan coasts. It is made up of a set of six panels, two for the Annunciation (Archangel Gabriel and Blessed Virgin Mary) and the other four for the prophets and Christ. From the roof, a 15th-century crucifix hangs above the modern high altar (the ancient one was sold along with many others; only four altars remain today).

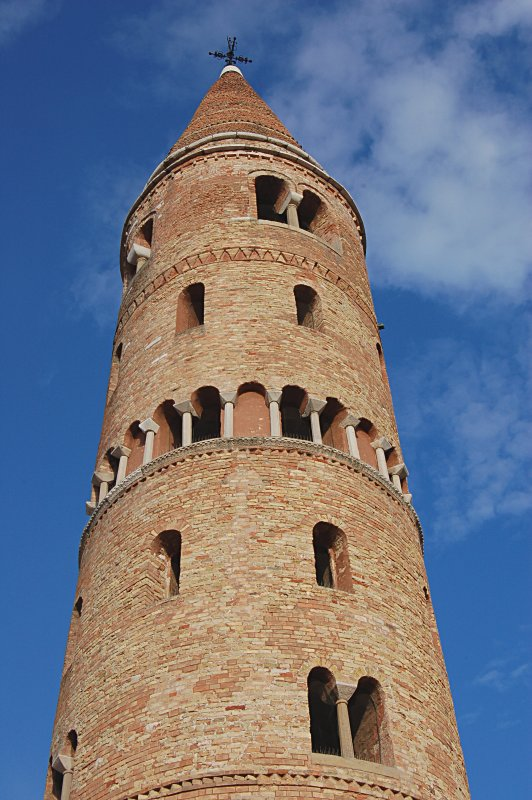
The cylindrical bell tower of the cathedral.

Outside, the characteristic bell tower, dating to 1048, rises to a height of 48 meters. It is a typical example of Romanesque style, but it has a cylindrical structure, and it is surmounted by a cone-shaped cusp, that makes it unique in the world.

The cathedral owns a liturgical museum, inaugurated on September 13, 1975 by Patriarch Albino Luciani (future Pope John Paul I) in the old bishops' chapel; it keep vestments, altar cloths and holy vessels of the Caprulan bishops, and of the Pope John XXIII, who was very attached to Caorle since he was also Patriarch of Venice. When he became Pope, his servants were two Caprulan brothers. In the museum, there are also a precious silver "Capitular Cross", six icons of the apostles (which formed the ancient iconostasis), painted by Venetian school of art in the 12th - 13th centuries, and a silver-gold reliquary, said of "the most precious Blood", which, according to tradition, contains some of the ground on which the bleeding Jesus Christ passed before he was crucified. Another important piece of the museum is the St Stephen reliquary, which contains the skull of Saint Stephen, Patron of Caorle.

=== Church of the Blessed Virgin of the Angel ===
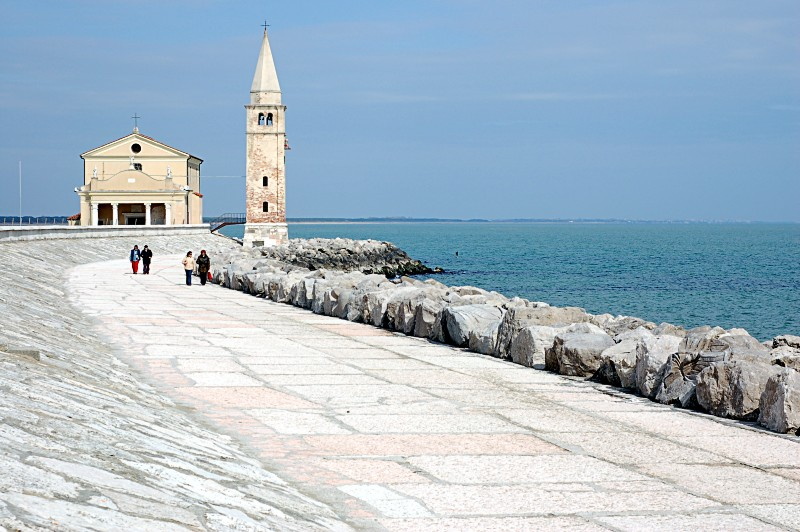
The Church of the Blessed Virgin of the Angel on the sea.

The Church of Blessed Virgin of the Angel is built on a little promontory on the sea. In ancient times, the church had three naves, but the sea repeatedly destroyed one of them, so in the 18th century the church was rebuilt, with the structure that it has today. The legend says that one day a number of fishermen saw a light on the sea; when they approached it, they found a statue of the Virgin Mary with the Child, and they carried it ashore. The bishop and the townspeople tried to carry the statue to the cathedral but it was very heavy; so the bishop called a group of children who, because of their innocence, succeeded in carrying it to the nearby church of Archangel Michael (for reason called the "Virgin of the Angel").

Devotion to the "Virgin of the sea" is very important to the Caprulans; to her are dedicated two festivals, the annual Feast of Incoronation, during which takes place the traditional "fire of the bell tower", with fireworks, and the Feast of the Virgin of the Angel which, in accordance with the wishes of Pope John XXIII, takes place every five years.

Being the church at the end of the waterfront promenade, its bell tower is used as a lighthouse.

== Tourism ==
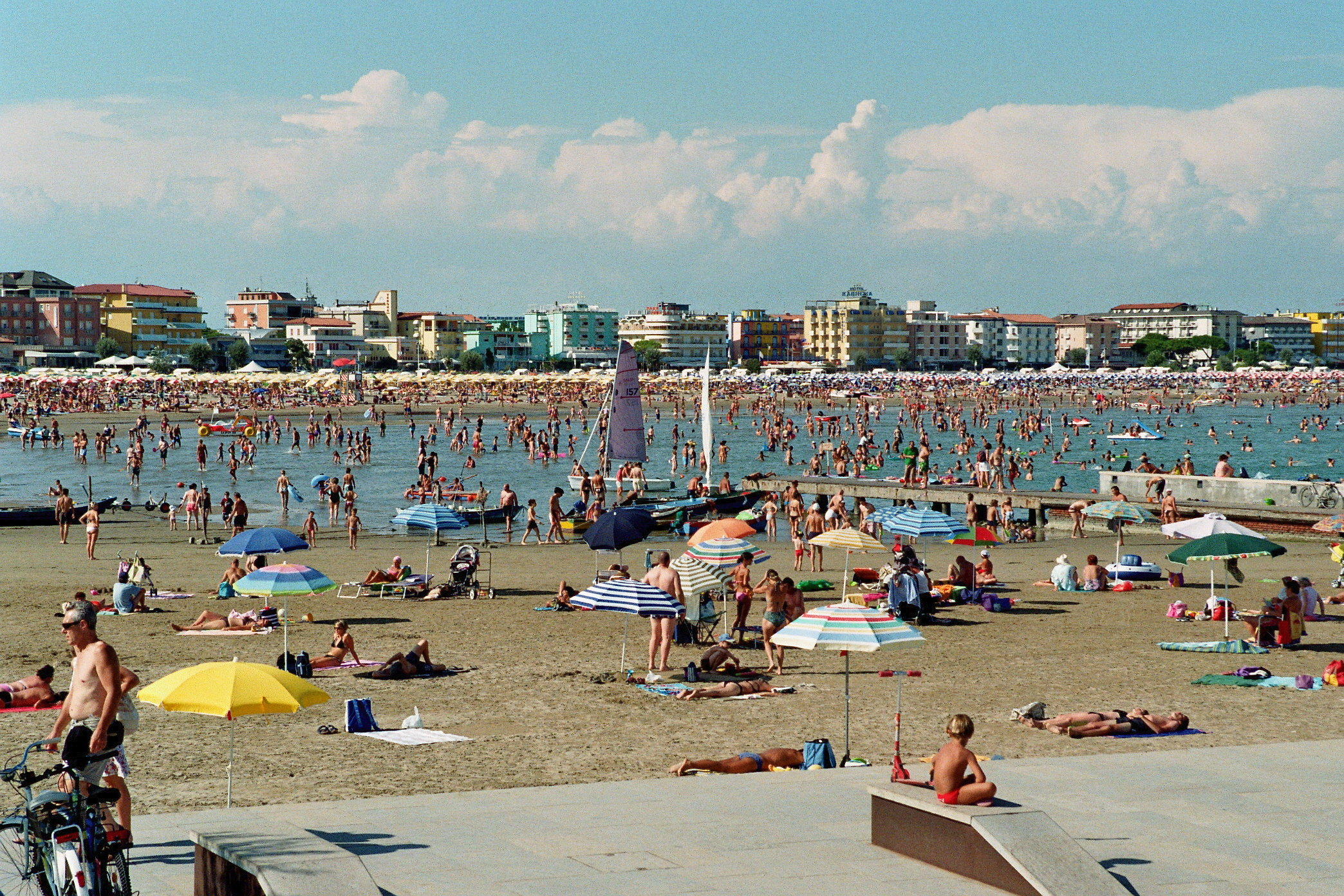
The beach

Caorle is a small city, but is frequented by tourists in all seasons. The old town centre is still structured as a little Venetian corner, with its coloured houses, its "calli" (alleys) and "campielli" (squares). During the summer many family-oriented activities take place on its long beach. Others are organized in its lagoon (an example of Venetian lagoon), where many characteristic traditional "casoni" (the huts where fishermen lived in the winter while fishing) still stand.

== Notable people ==
Recently, the city of Caorle gave honorary citizenship to Rigoberta Menchú Tum (Nobel Peace Prize) and to Cardinal Angelo Scola, Patriarch of Venice.
