= Solange Nyiraneza =

Rwandan sitting volleyball player (born 1996)

Personal information
- Born: 28 June 1996 (age 30) Ruhango, Rwanda

Sport
- Sport: Sitting volleyball
Medal record
Representing Rwanda
African Championships
Gold medal – first place	2015 Nairobi	Women's tournament

Solange Nyiraneza (born 28 June 1996) is a Rwandan sitting volleyball player who competes in sitting volleyball competitions. She competed at the 2016, 2020 and 2024 Summer Paralympics.

== Personal life ==
Nyiraneza's parents, who were mixed Hutu-Tutsi, were killed in a robbery when she was three months old, her older sister and brother looked after her. When Solange was aged five, she went to play outside with her brother then fell and broke her patella, she hid her injury for a week to avoid her sister getting angry at her. They took her to hospital to have bone density tests and it was later discovered that Nyiraneza had bone cancer, she had her left leg amputated below the hip.
