= Rwanda at the Paralympics =

- IPC code: RWA
- NPC: National Paralympic Committee of Rwanda
- Medals: Gold 0 Silver 0 Bronze 1 Total 1

Summer appearances
- 2000; 2004; 2008; 2012; 2016; 2020; 2024

Rwanda made its Paralympic Games début at the 2000 Summer Paralympics in Sydney. It was represented by a single competitor, male swimmer Cesar Rwagasana. In 2004, Rwanda sent two runners: Olive Akobasenga and Jean de Dieu Nkundabera. Nkundabera won bronze in men's 800m race (T46 category). He was the country's sole representative in 2008, entering the same event, but this time failed to advance past the heats.

Rwanda has never participated in the Winter Paralympics.

== Full results for Rwanda at the Paralympics ==
Name	Games	Sport	Event	Result	Rank
Cesar Rwagasana	2000 Sydney	Swimming	Men's 50 m Freestyle S10	42.39	7th (last) in heat 2; did not advance
Olive Akobasenga	2004 Athens	Athletics	Women's 200 m T46	31.81	6th (last) in heat 2; did not advance
Jean de Dieu Nkundabera	2004 Athens	Athletics	Men's 800 m T46	heats: 1:59.30 (5th in heat 1) final: 1:58.95	Bronze
Jean de Dieu Nkundabera	2008 Beijing	Athletics	Men's 800 m T46	2:02.12	5th in heat 2; did not advance
Hermas Muvunyi	2012 London	Athletics	Men's 400 m T46	heats: 49.75 final:49.59	1st in heat 2; 5th in final
Hermas Muvunyi	2012 London	Athletics	Men's 800 m T46	heats: 1:58.18 final:DSQ	2nd in heat 2; disqualified in final
Theoneste Nsengimana	2012 London	Athletics	Men's 1500 m T46	4:08.83	8th in heat 2; did not advance
Theogene Hakizimana	2012 London	Powerlifting	Men's 82.5 kg	175 kg	10th
Rwanda men's national sitting volleyball team	2012 London	Sitting volleyball	Men's volleyball	0–4 in group B; won 9th place match	9th
Hermas Muvunyi	2016 Rio	Athletics	Men's 400 m T47	heats: 49.99 final: DSQ	2nd in heat 1; disqualified in final
Hermas Muvunyi	2016 Rio	Athletics	Men's 1500 m T46	4:05.19	5th
Rwanda women's national sitting volleyball team	2016 Rio	Sitting volleyball	Women's volleyball	0–3 in group B; lost 7th place match	8th
Rwanda women's national sitting volleyball team	2020 Tokyo	Sitting volleyball	Women's volleyball	0–3 in group B; won 7th place match	7th
Emmanuel Niyibizi	2024 Paris	Athletics	Men's 1500 m T46	DQ	disqualified
Rwanda women's national sitting volleyball team	2024 Paris	Sitting volleyball	Women's volleyball	0–3 in group B; won 7th place match	7th

== See also ==
- Rwanda at the Olympics
