= Rwanda at the 2004 Summer Paralympics =

- IPC code: RWA
- NPC: National Paralympic Committee of Rwanda

in Athens
- Competitors: 2 in 1 sport
- Flag bearer: Jean de Dieu Nkundabera
- Medals Ranked 73rd: Gold 0 Silver 0 Bronze 1 Total 1

Summer Paralympics appearances (overview)
- 2000; 2004; 2008; 2012; 2016; 2020; 2024

Rwanda competed at the 2004 Summer Paralympics in Athens, Greece. The team included one man and one woman. Competitors from Rwanda won one bronze medal to finish 73rd in the medal table.

== Medallists ==
Medal	Name	Sport	Event
Bronze	Jean de Dieu Nkundabera	Athletics	Men's 800m T46

== Sports ==
=== Athletics ===
==== Men's track ====
Athlete	Class	Event	Heats		Semifinal		Final	
Athlete	Class	Event	Result	Rank	Result	Rank	Result	Rank
Jean de Dieu Nkundabera	T46	800m	1:59.30	5 q	—		1:58.95	3rd place, bronze medalist(s)

==== Women's track ====
Athlete	Class	Event	Heats		Semifinal		Final	
Athlete	Class	Event	Result	Rank	Result	Rank	Result	Rank
Olive Akobasenga	T46	200m	31.81	12	did not advance			

== See also ==
- Rwanda at the Paralympics
- Rwanda at the 2004 Summer Olympics
