= Ana Luísa Aparecida =

Brazilian Paralympic volleyball player

Personal information
- Full name: Ana Luísa Aparecida de Souza; Ana Luísa Aparecida de Souza Soares
- Born: 28 March 2001 (age 25); São Paulo, Brazil
Medal record
Women's sitting volleyball
Representing Brazil
Paralympic Games
Bronze medal – third place	2020 Tokyo	Team
World Championship
Gold medal – first place	2022 Sarajevo	Team

Ana Luísa Aparecida de Souza Soares (born 28 March 2001 in São Paulo) is a Brazilian Paralympic volleyball player. She competed at the 2020 Summer Paralympics, in sitting volleyball, winning a bronze medal as a member of the Brazilian team.

When she was fourteen years old she fractured her femur bone in her right leg due to a motorcycle accident, and that resulted in reduced movement in the limb.
