= List of participating nations at the Summer Olympic Games =

List of Olympics participants

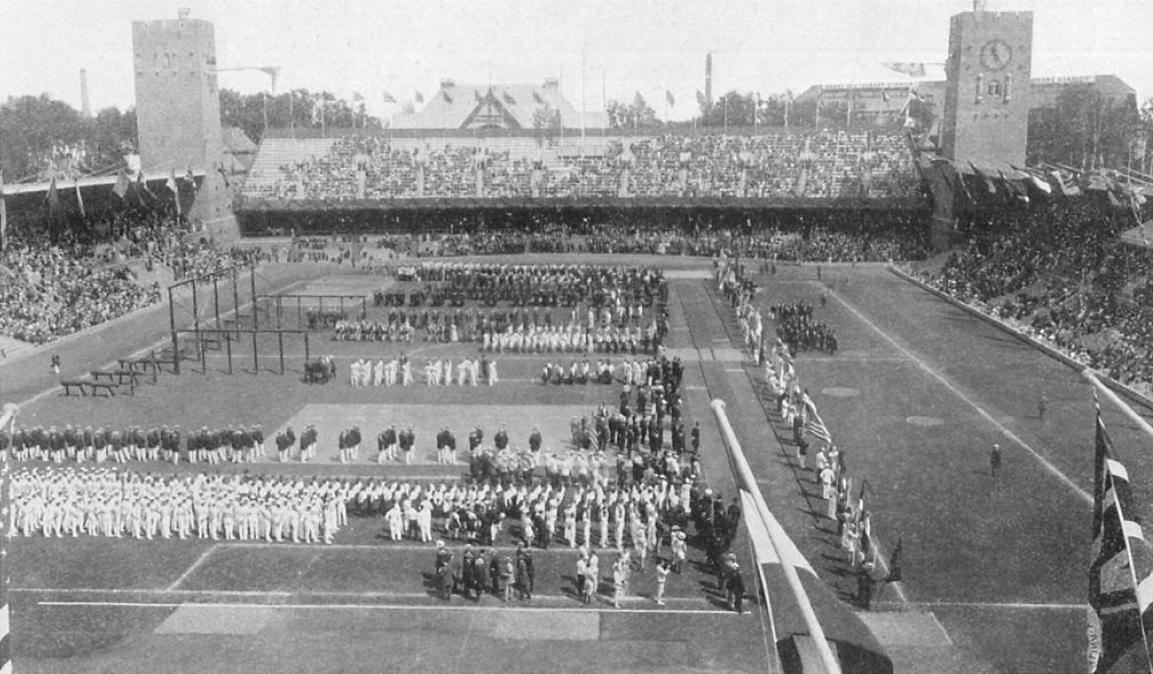
Participating nations at the opening ceremony of the 1912 Games in Stockholm

This is a list of nations, as represented by National Olympic Committees (NOCs), that have participated in the Summer Olympic Games between 1896 and 2024. As of the 2024 Games, all of the current 206 NOCs have participated in at least two editions of the Olympic Games. Athletes from Australia,^{a} France,^{[K]} Great Britain, Greece, Italy,^{[R]} and Switzerland^{[M]} have competed in all thirty Summer Olympic Games.

== History ==
=== Early years ===
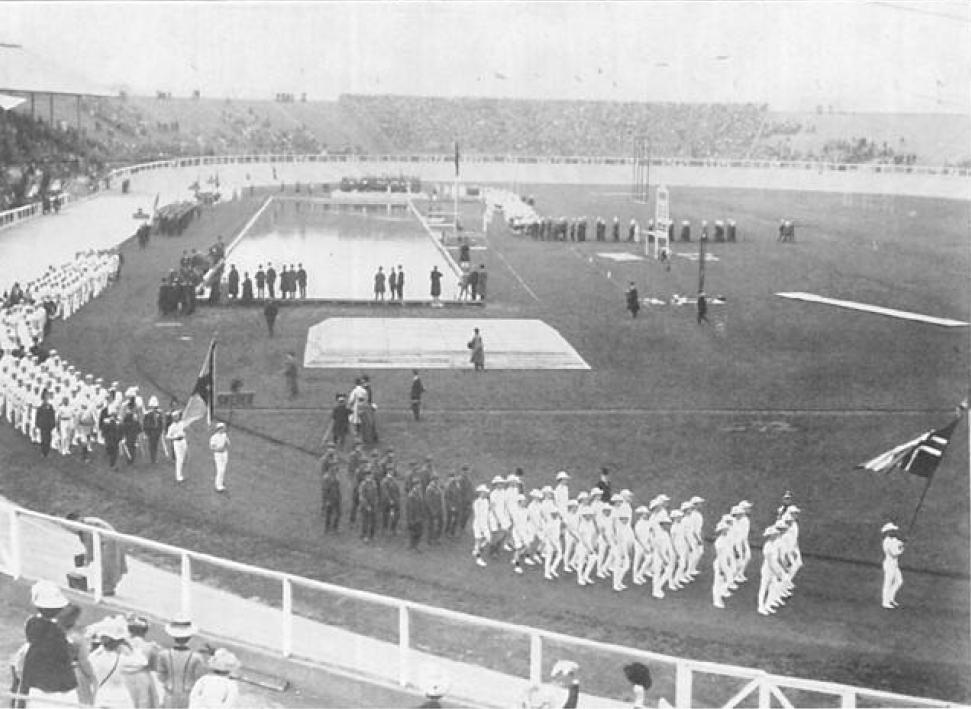
Participating nations at the opening ceremony of the 1908 Games in London

Early Games were not clearly documented with respect to participating nations. Competitors from 11 to 16 nation participated in the inaugural 1896 Games, in Athens. Eleven nations (Australia, Austria, Denmark, Great Britain, France, Germany, Greece, Hungary, Sweden, Switzerland, and the United States) are mentioned in the official report for the Games, and the International Olympic Committee (IOC) states that 14 nations were represented. The NOCs for Bulgaria and Chile each claim that they were represented by a single athlete in Athens. Other sources also list Egypt, Italy, and the Turkish Empire.

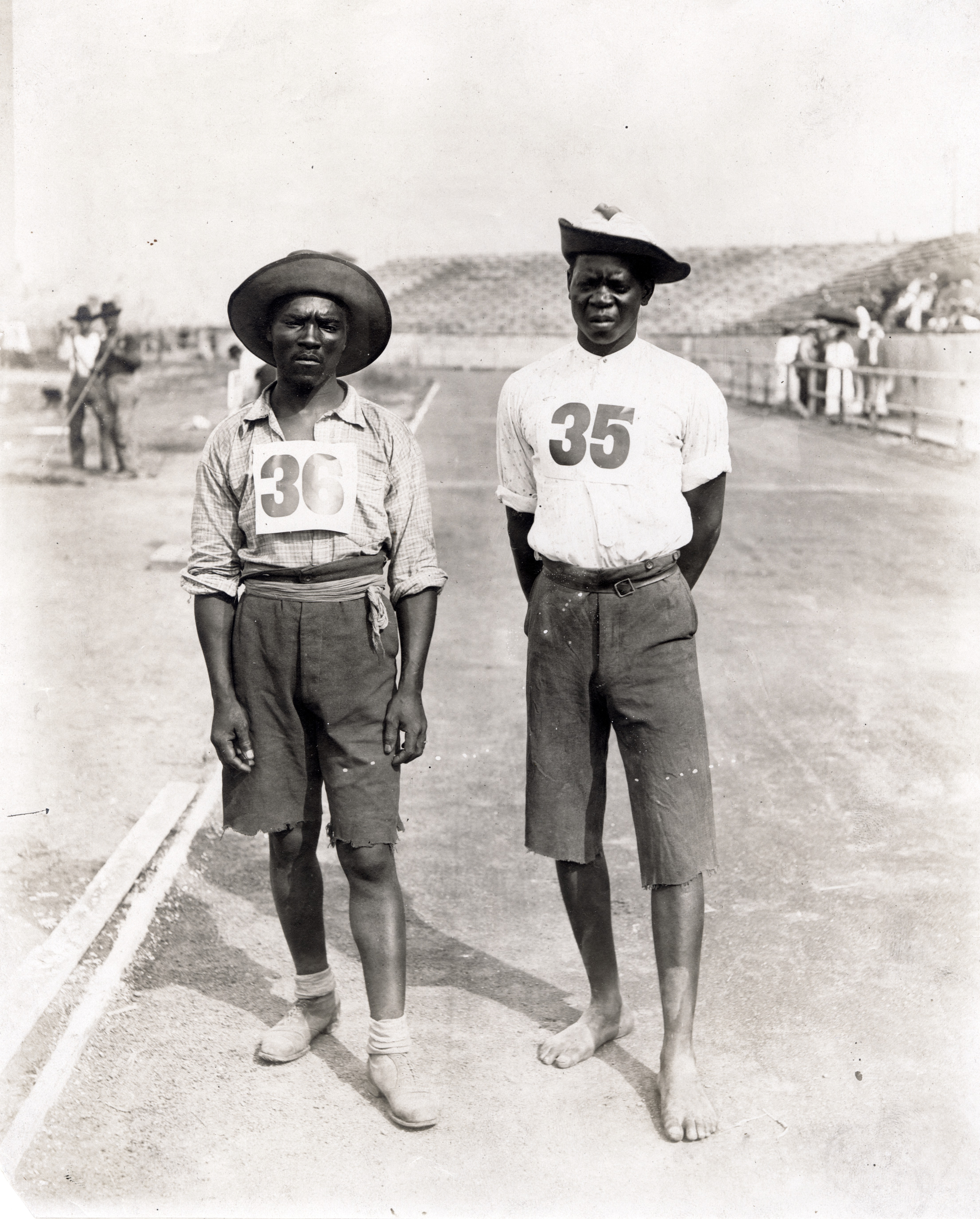
"Zulus" Marathon runners at 1904 Games in St. Louis

While official report was actually the summary of the sporting events held at the 1900 Exposition Universelle and so can not be considered as reliable source, the IOC states that 24 nations participated in the 1900 Summer Olympics in Paris, but additional sources list up to 28 nations, with Haiti, Iran, Luxembourg, and Peru being the additions. The 1904 Games, held in St. Louis were the first Olympics outside of Europe, with very few top-class athletes from outside the North America taking part, and saw the participation of 12 to 15 nations, including a not yet existing Union of South Africa represented by a Boer team of extras from the Louisiana Purchase Exposition. Although the Intercalated Games of 1906 are no longer considered official Games of the Olympiad by the IOC, they helped restore the Olympic movement. Participation at subsequent Games grew steadily, with 22 nations in London for 1908 and 28 nations in Stockholm for the 1912 Games. At these two Games (only), one of the delegations was actually a combined team of athletes from Australia and New Zealand, designated Australasia. The Games of 1916, planned for Berlin, were cancelled due to World War I.

=== Inter-war years ===
After the First World War, the Olympic Games resumed in 1920, in Antwerp. Twenty-nine nations participated, but not Austria, Bulgaria, Germany, Hungary, or Turkey, none of which were invited because of their roles in the war. Several newly created European states, such as Czechoslovakia and Yugoslavia, made their Olympic debut.

The Games grew rapidly for the 1924 Summer Olympics, in Paris, with 44 nations present, even though Germany was still not invited back to the Games. This situation would change for the 1928 Games where Germany returned to join a total of 46 participating nations. Competitors from 37 nations travelled to Los Angeles for the 1932 Summer Olympics. The 1936 Summer Olympics, in Berlin, were attended by 49 nations (a new high) but were highly politicized. The scheduled Games of 1940 in Tokyo or Helsinki and 1944 in London were each cancelled due to the outbreak of World War II in 1939.

=== Post-war years and Cold War era ===
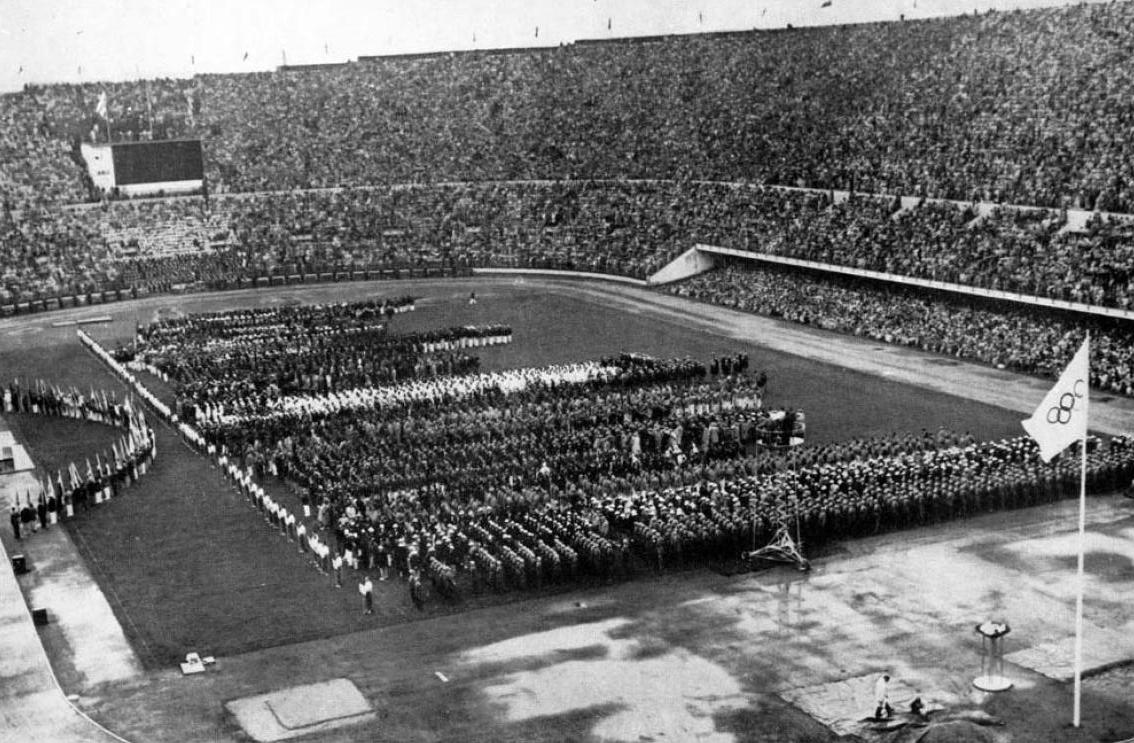
Participating nations at the opening ceremony of the 1952 Games in Helsinki

Twelve years after the previous Games, the 1948 Summer Olympics, in London, attracted competitors from 59 nations, including 14 that made their Olympic debut; once again, Germany was not invited to take part, and neither was Japan. The 1952 Games, in Helsinki, again set a new high, with 69 nations participating, including the first appearance by the Soviet Union and People's Republic of China and the return of Germany and Japan. The 1956 Summer Olympics, attended by 67 nations in Melbourne, were the first to be marred by a boycott. Egypt, Iraq, and Lebanon withdrew in response to the Suez Crisis, and the Netherlands, Spain, and Switzerland withdrew in response to the Soviet invasion of Hungary. Because of Australian quarantine restrictions, the equestrian events were held five months earlier in Stockholm, with a total of 29 participating nations, including five nations that did not compete in Melbourne.

Participation by African and Latin American nations increased significantly during the 1960s. A total of 84 nations were represented at the 1960 Summer Olympics, in Rome, 94 nations at the 1964 Games, in Tokyo, and 112 nations at the 1968 Summer Olympics, in Mexico City. The 1968 Games also marked the first time that West Germany and East Germany competed as independent teams. For the previous three Olympiads (1956–1964), the two NOCs were jointly represented by a united German team. The 1972 Summer Olympics, in Munich, featured 121 nations, the highest total yet.

The next three Games were each marred by significant boycotts. At the 1976 Summer Olympics, in Montreal, only 92 nations were represented. Twenty-nine African nations (Ivory Coast and Senegal being the only two exceptions) boycotted the Games because of New Zealand's participation, as New Zealand maintained other sporting relations with apartheid South Africa. The largest Olympic boycott took place at the 1980 Games, in Moscow, when only 80 nations participated. The United States led the boycott in protest of the December 1979 Soviet invasion of Afghanistan, and were joined by more than 60 other nations. In response, the 1984 Summer Olympics, in Los Angeles, were boycotted by the Soviet Union and their allies, yet a total of 140 nations did participate. The 1988 Games, in Seoul, marked a new high, with 160 participating nations.

=== Recent Games ===
Several events in the 1990s led to a large increase in participating nations at the Olympic Games. After the dissolution of the Soviet Union, the Baltic states competed as independent nations for the first time since 1936 at the 1992 Games, in Barcelona. The remaining twelve ex-republics of the Soviet Union competed together as the Unified Team for these Games. A single German team competed for the first time since 1964, after the German reunification in 1990, while the breakup of Yugoslavia resulted in the Olympic debut of new nations.

The Centennial Olympics, in Atlanta, were attended by athletes from 197 nations, including 24 nations making their Summer Games debut. Czechoslovakia had split into the Czech Republic and Slovakia, and all ex-Soviet republics competed as independent nations. The Games continued to grow, with 199 nations represented in Sydney, for the 2000 Summer Games, and 201 nations in Athens, for the 2004 Summer Olympics.

A record number of nations (204) were represented at the 2008 Summer Olympics in Beijing, with Marshall Islands and Tuvalu making their Olympic debut. After competing together as Serbia and Montenegro in 2004, Serbia and Montenegro sent independent teams to Beijing. Only Brunei failed to participate in the Games, after failing to register any athletes for competition. The 2012 Games in London increased this record to 206 nations, even though only 204 NOCs were represented. Brunei returned to the Games, but athletes from the former Netherlands Antilles competed as Independent Olympic Athletes, after the Netherlands Antilles Olympic Committee's membership in the IOC was withdrawn in 2011 as a consequence of the dissolution of the Caribbean country. One athlete from South Sudan also competed as an independent athlete, since the nation had not yet formed a National Olympic Committee after its independence in 2011.

A further increase occurred in the 2016 Summer Olympics, with 206 nations represented: South Sudanese athletes were able to compete under their nation's flag and Kosovo made their debut as an independent team. There was also a team made up of refugees, made up of athletes from the Democratic Republic of the Congo, Ethiopia, South Sudan and Syria who had fled their home countries and could not compete under their home NOC.

Despite the COVID-19 pandemic crisis, the 2020 Summer Olympics in 2021 also had 206 teams represented, with only North Korea boycotting. However, the Russian Olympic Committee was banned, and Russian athletes competed as independent athletes with no national flag and anthem, due to doping sanctions. On 28 March 2023, it was announced that Russian and Belarusian athletes compete as Individual Neutral Athletes and the abbreviation AIN, and North Korea returned to Paris 2024.

== List of nations ==
Nations that have participated in the Summer Olympics

=== Description ===
This list includes all 206 current NOCs, 25 obsolete NOCs and 3 other entries, arranged alphabetically. The three-letter country code is also listed for each NOC. Since the 1960s, these codes have been frequently used by the IOC and each Games organizing committee to identify NOCs, such as within the official report of each Games. However, in this section, several countries uses long-form names designated by the United Nations uses short form common names such as for example: Laos (Lao People's Democratic Republic), North Korea (Democratic People's Republic of Korea), and Moldova (Republic of Moldova).

Several nations have changed during their Olympic history. Name changes due to geographical renaming are explained by footnotes after the nation's name, and other notes are explained by footnotes linked within the table itself.

=== Obsolete nations ===
Obsolete nations are included in the table to more clearly illustrate past Olympic appearances for their successor nations.

- ANZ. In the 1908 and 1912 Games, athletes from Australia and New Zealand competed together as a single team, designated Australasia (ANZ).
- ROC. The Republic of China (ROC) was designated as China from 1932 to 1948, representing all of China (including Taiwan at the 1948 Games) using the code (CHN) at those times. After the Chinese Civil War, Taiwan participated using the Republic of China designation in 1956, 1960, 1964, and 1972 by using the codes (CHN), (RCF), (TWN) and (ROC) respectively.
- BOH, TCH. Prior to the foundation of Czechoslovakia after World War I, athletes from Bohemia (BOH) (now part of the present-day Czech Republic) competed in 1900, 1908, and 1912. Czechoslovakia (TCH) participated in 1920–1992, from 1996 represented by two successor NOCs of Czech Republic (CZE) and Slovakia (SVK).
- SAA, EUA, FRG, GDR. Due to the partition of Germany after World War II, Germany was represented by two teams at the 1952 Games—Germany and the Saar (SAA). The Saar was reintegrated into the Federal Republic of Germany in 1956, and Saar athletes then competed for Germany. East Germany did not contribute athletes to the 1952 team, as the National Olympic Committee for the German Democratic Republic was only granted "provisional" recognition by the IOC in 1955. For the Games of 1956–1964, Germany participated as a United Team of Germany (GER), representing the National Olympic Committees of both East Germany and West Germany. Retrospectively, the IOC uses the country code EUA for this team. After the NOC for the German Democratic Republic was granted full recognition by the IOC in 1968, East Germany (GDR) and West Germany (FRG) participated as two distinct teams at the Games of 1968–1988 before the German Reunification in 1990.
- MAL, NBO. Prior to the formation of the Federation of Malaysia in 1963, athletes from Malaya (MAL) competed at the 1956 Games and 1960 Games, and athletes from North Borneo (NBO) competed at the 1956 Games.
- AHO. The NOC of the Netherlands Antilles (AHO) was recognized by the IOC from 1950 until 2011 upon the dissolution of the Netherlands Antilles.
- RU1, URS, EUN, ROC, AIN. The Russian Empire (RU1) participated in three Games prior to World War I. Soviet Union (URS) participated at the Games of 1952–1988. After the dissolution of the Soviet Union in 1991, the fifteen ex-republics of the Soviet Union were all represented at the 1992 Summer Olympics. Estonia, Latvia, and Lithuania participated as independent teams, and the other twelve nations participated as a combined Unified Team (EUN). Since 1996 they are represented by fifteen successor NOCs. Russian athletes competed as the Russian Olympic Committee (ROC) at the 2020 Summer Olympics due to doping-related sanctions, and they also competed as Individual Neutral Athletes (AIN) at the 2024 Summer Olympics due to the Russian attack on Ukraine.
- YUG, IOP, SCG. The Kingdom of Yugoslavia (officially the Kingdom of Serbs, Croats and Slovenes until 1929) participated as Yugoslavia (YUG) in five Games before the Second World War. The Socialist Federal Republic of Yugoslavia also participated using the Yugoslavia (YUG) designation, for all Games between 1948 and 1988. Because of United Nations sanctions in Security Council Resolution 757, athletes from the Federal Republic of Yugoslavia (Serbia and Montenegro) competed as Independent Olympic Participants (IOP) at the 1992 Games. They were not permitted to compete in team sports such as basketball, handball, or water polo, and the Olympic flag was used in medal ceremonies. Athletes from the Republic of Macedonia also competed as Independent Olympic Participants (IOP) at the 1992 Games because their NOC had not been formed. The Federal Republic of Yugoslavia (later State Union of Serbia and Montenegro), consisting of the Republic of Serbia and the Republic of Montenegro, participated at the Games of 1996 and 2000 as Yugoslavia (YUG), and at the Games of 2004 as Serbia and Montenegro (SCG). In 2008 and 2012, the former republics of Yugoslavia were represented by six successor NOCs. In 2016, the autonomous province of Kosovo, which declared independence in 2008 and is partially recognised as a sovereign state, became the seventh successor NOC.
- BWI. Athletes from Barbados, Jamaica, and Trinidad and Tobago competed as the British West Indies (BWI) at the 1960 Games. The West Indies Federation only existed as a nation from 1958 to 1962, so the constituent nations once again competed independently in 1964.
- YAR, YMD. Prior to Yemenite unification in 1990, North Yemen participated as the Yemen Arab Republic (YAR) in 1984 and 1988, and South Yemen participated as the Yemen Democratic Republic (YMD) in the 1988 Games.
- RHO. Southern Rhodesia first participated as Rhodesia in the Olympic Games in 1928, when it sent two boxers to Amsterdam, both of whom were eliminated in their second bout. The colony did not appear at the Games under a Rhodesian banner until 1960, when it sent a fourteen-athlete delegation as part of the Federation of Rhodesia and Nyasaland. In Rome, two sailors, Alan David Butler and Christopher Bevan, finished fourth, which was Rhodesia's best result until it became Zimbabwe in 1980. Southern Rhodesia sent 29 competitors, including a field hockey team, to the 1964 Summer Games, which was its last Olympic appearance under the Rhodesian banner. In 1965, Prime Minister Ian Smith declared a unilateral independence that allowed the country's white minority to dominate the government. The United Kingdom pressured the Mexican state to deny Rhodesia an invitation to the 1968 Summer Olympics and supported a proposed African boycott of the Games that ultimately prevented Rhodesia from taking part. The nation was positioned to compete at the Olympics in 1972 and reached the Olympic Village before a last-minute International Olympic Committee (IOC) decision barred its athletes from participating. The National Olympic Committee was expelled permanently in 1975 and Rhodesia never again participated under that banner. Rhodesia never took part in the Winter Olympic Games and no Rhodesian competitor ever won an Olympic medal, although it was able to continue competing at the Paralympics through 1972 and reached the podium on multiple occasions.

=== Other entries ===
- ZZX. Between 1896 and 1904 Olympic Games allowed for individuals in a team, designated later as Mixed teams, to be from different nations.
- IOA. Athletes from Timor-Leste competed as Individual Olympic Athletes (IOA) at the 2000 Games. Athletes from the former Netherlands Antilles and South Sudan competed as Independent Olympic Athletes (IOA) at the 2012 Games. Athletes from Kuwait competed as Independent Olympic Athletes (IOA) at the 2016 Games.
- EOR (previously ROT). Owing to the refugee crisis, a refugee team was formed at the 2016 Summer Olympics. It consists of athletes from the Democratic Republic of Congo, Ethiopia, South Sudan and Syria, who have fled their home countries and cannot compete under the home NOC. It returned for the 2020 Summer Olympics and was expanded to include athletes from Afghanistan, Cameroon, Congo, Eritrea, Iran, Iraq, Sudan and Venezuela.

=== Table legend ===
96	In the table headings, indicates the Games year
•	Participated in the specified Games
H	Host nation for the specified Games
^{[A]}	Additional explanatory comments at the linked footnote
	The planned Games of 1916, 1940, and 1944 were cancelled due to world wars
	NOC superseded or preceded by other NOC(s) during these years

=== Alphabetical list ===
A	Code	96	00	04	08	12	16	20	24	28	32	36	40	44	48	52	56	60	64	68	72	76	80	84	88	92	96	00	04	08	12	16	20	24	Total
Afghanistan	AFG											•			•		•	•	•	•	•		•		•		•		•	•	•	•	•	•	16
Albania	ALB																				•					•	•	•	•	•	•	•	•	•	10
Algeria	ALG	France						France							France				•	•	•		•	•	•	•	•	•	•	•	•	•	•	•	15
American Samoa	ASA																								•	•	•	•	•	•	•	•	•	•	10
Andorra	AND																					•	•	•	•	•	•	•	•	•	•	•	•	•	13
Angola	ANG																						•		•	•	•	•	•	•	•	•	•	•	11
Antigua and Barbuda	ANT																					•		•	•	•	•	•	•	•	•	•	•	•	12
Argentina	ARG		•		•			•	•	•	•	•			•	•	•	•	•	•	•	•		•	•	•	•	•	•	•	•	•	•	•	26
Armenia	ARM	Russian Empire						Soviet Union							Soviet Union											^{EUN}	•	•	•	•	•	•	•	•	8
Aruba	ARU	AHO						AHO							Netherlands Antilles										•	•	•	•	•	•	•	•	•	•	10
Australia	AUS	•	•	•	ANZ			•	•	•	•	•			•	•	H	•	•	•	•	•	•	•	•	•	•	H	•	•	•	•	•	•	28
Australasia ^{[^]}	ANZ				•	•																													2
Austria	AUT	•	•	•	•	•			•	•	•	•			•	•	•	•	•	•	•	•	•	•	•	•	•	•	•	•	•	•	•	•	29
Azerbaijan	AZE	Russian Empire						Soviet Union							Soviet Union											^{EUN}	•	•	•	•	•	•	•	•	8
B	Code	96	00	04	08	12	16	20	24	28	32	36	40	44	48	52	56	60	64	68	72	76	80	84	88	92	96	00	04	08	12	16	20	24	Total
Bahamas	BAH															•	•	•	•	•	•	•		•	•	•	•	•	•	•	•	•	•	•	18
Bahrain	BRN																							•	•	•	•	•	•	•	•	•	•	•	11
Bangladesh	BAN	India						India							Pakistan									•	•	•	•	•	•	•	•	•	•	•	11
Barbados	BAR																	^{BWI}		•	•	•		•	•	•	•	•	•	•	•	•	•	•	14
Belarus	BLR	Russian Empire						Soviet Union							Soviet Union											^{EUN}	•	•	•	•	•	•	•	^{AIN}	7
Belgium	BEL		•		•	•		H	•	•	•	•			•	•	•	•	•	•	•	•	•	•	•	•	•	•	•	•	•	•	•	•	28
Belize	BIZ																			•	•	•		•	•	•	•	•	•	•	•	•	•	•	14
Benin	BEN																				•		•	•	•	•	•	•	•	•	•	•	•	•	13
Bermuda	BER											•			•	•	•	•	•	•	•	•		•	•	•	•	•	•	•	•	•	•	•	20
Bhutan	BHU																							•	•	•	•	•	•	•	•	•	•	•	11
Bolivia	BOL											•							•	•	•	•		•	•	•	•	•	•	•	•	•	•	•	16
Bosnia and Herzegovina	BIH							Yugoslavia							Yugoslavia											•	•	•	•	•	•	•	•	•	9
Botswana	BOT																						•	•	•	•	•	•	•	•	•	•	•	•	12
Brazil	BRA		^{[D]}					•	•		•	•			•	•	•	•	•	•	•	•	•	•	•	•	•	•	•	•	•	H	•	•	24
British Virgin Islands	IVB																							•	•	•	•	•	•	•	•	•	•	•	11
Brunei	BRU																								^{[Q]}		•	•	•		•	•	•	•	7
Bulgaria	BUL	•^{[A]}							•	•		•				•	•	•	•	•	•	•	•		•	•	•	•	•	•	•	•	•	•	22
Burkina Faso	BUR																				•				•	•	•	•	•	•	•	•	•	•	11
Burundi	BDI																										•	•	•	•	•	•	•	•	8
C	Code	96	00	04	08	12	16	20	24	28	32	36	40	44	48	52	56	60	64	68	72	76	80	84	88	92	96	00	04	08	12	16	20	24	Total
Cambodia	CAM																•^{[M]}		•		•						•	•	•	•	•	•	•	•	11
Cameroon	CMR																		•	•	•	•^{[P]}	•	•	•	•	•	•	•	•	•	•	•	•	16
Canada	CAN		•	•	•	•		•	•	•	•	•			•	•	•	•	•	•	•	H		•	•	•	•	•	•	•	•	•	•	•	28
Cape Verde	CPV																										•	•	•	•	•	•	•	•	8
Cayman Islands	CAY																					•		•	•	•	•	•	•	•	•	•	•	•	12
Central African Republic	CAF																			•				•	•	•	•	•	•	•	•	•	•	•	12
Chad	CHA																		•	•	•			•	•	•	•	•	•	•	•	•	•	•	14
Chile	CHI	•^{[B]}				•		•	•	•		•			•	•	•	•	•	•	•	•		•	•	•	•	•	•	•	•	•	•	•	25
China	CHN	ROC						ROC							^{ROC}	•								•	•	•	•	•	•	H	•	•	•	•	12
Chinese Taipei (Taiwan)	TPE					^{JPN}		Japan							^{ROC}		•	•	•	•	•			•	•	•	•	•	•	•	•	•	•	•	18
Republic of China ^{[^]}	ROC								•		•	•			•																				3
Colombia	COL		^{[E]}								•	•			•		•	•	•	•	•	•	•	•	•	•	•	•	•	•	•	•	•	•	21
Comoros	COM																										•	•	•	•	•	•	•	•	8
Republic of the Congo	CGO																		•		•		•	•	•	•	•	•	•	•	•	•	•	•	14
Democratic Republic of the Congo	COD																			•				•	•	•	•	•	•	•	•	•	•	•	12
Cook Islands	COK																								•	•	•	•	•	•	•	•	•	•	10
Costa Rica	CRC											•							•	•	•	•	•	•	•	•	•	•	•	•	•	•	•	•	17
Ivory Coast	CIV																		•	•	•	•		•	•	•	•	•	•	•	•	•	•	•	15
Croatia	CRO	Austria/Hungary						Yugoslavia							Yugoslavia											•	•	•	•	•	•	•	•	•	9
Cuba	CUB		•	•					•	•					•	•	•	•	•	•	•	•	•			•	•	•	•	•	•	•	•	•	22
Cyprus	CYP																						•	•	•	•	•	•	•	•	•	•	•	•	12
Czech Republic	CZE	Bohemia						Czechoslovakia							Czechoslovakia												•	•	•	•	•	•	•	•	8
Bohemia ^{[^]}	BOH		•		•	•																													3
Czechoslovakia ^{[^]}	TCH							•	•	•	•	•			•	•	•	•	•	•	•	•	•		•	•									16
D	Code	96	00	04	08	12	16	20	24	28	32	36	40	44	48	52	56	60	64	68	72	76	80	84	88	92	96	00	04	08	12	16	20	24	Total
Denmark	DEN	•	•		•	•		•	•	•	•	•			•	•	•	•	•	•	•	•	•	•	•	•	•	•	•	•	•	•	•	•	29
Djibouti	DJI																							•	•	•	•	•	^{[Q]}	•	•	•	•	•	10
Dominica	DMA																										•	•	•	•	•	•	•	•	8
Dominican Republic	DOM																		•	•	•	•	•	•	•	•	•	•	•	•	•	•	•	•	16
E	Code	96	00	04	08	12	16	20	24	28	32	36	40	44	48	52	56	60	64	68	72	76	80	84	88	92	96	00	04	08	12	16	20	24	Total
Ecuador	ECU								•											•	•	•	•	•	•	•	•	•	•	•	•	•	•	•	16
Egypt	EGY	^{[C]}				•		•	•	•		•			•	•	•^{[M]}	•	•	•	•	•^{[P]}		•	•	•	•	•	•	•	•	•	•	•	24
El Salvador	ESA																			•	•			•	•	•	•	•	•	•	•	•	•	•	13
Equatorial Guinea	GEQ																							•	•	•	•	•	•	•	•	•	•	•	11
Eritrea	ERI	Ethiopia						Ethiopia							Ethiopia													•	•	•	•	•	•	•	7
Estonia	EST	Russian Empire						•	•	•	•	•			Soviet Union											•	•	•	•	•	•	•	•	•	14
Eswatini	SWZ																				•			•	•	•	•	•	•	•	•	•	•	•	12
Ethiopia	ETH																•	•	•	•	•		•			•	•	•	•	•	•	•	•	•	15
F	Code	96	00	04	08	12	16	20	24	28	32	36	40	44	48	52	56	60	64	68	72	76	80	84	88	92	96	00	04	08	12	16	20	24	Total
Fiji	FIJ																•	•		•	•	•		•	•	•	•	•	•	•	•	•	•	•	16
Finland	FIN	RU1			•	•		•	•	•	•	•			•	H	•	•	•	•	•	•	•	•	•	•	•	•	•	•	•	•	•	•	27
France	FRA	•	H	^{[K]}	•	•		•	H	•	•	•			•	•	•	•	•	•	•	•	•	•	•	•	•	•	•	•	•	•	•	H	29
G	Code	96	00	04	08	12	16	20	24	28	32	36	40	44	48	52	56	60	64	68	72	76	80	84	88	92	96	00	04	08	12	16	20	24	Total
Gabon	GAB																				•			•	•	•	•	•	•	•	•	•	•	•	12
The Gambia	GAM																							•	•	•	•	•	•	•	•	•	•	•	11
Georgia	GEO	Russian Empire						Soviet Union							Soviet Union											^{EUN}	•	•	•	•	•	•	•	•	8
Germany	GER	•	•	•	•	•				•	•	H				•	EUA			GDR, FRG						•	•	•	•	•	•	•	•	•	18
Saar ^{[^]}	SAA															•																			1
United Team of Germany ^{[^]}	EUA																•	•	•																3
East Germany ^{[^]}	GDR																EUA			•	•	•	•		•										5
West Germany ^{[^]}	FRG																EUA			•	H	•		•	•										5
Ghana	GHA															•		•	•	•	•			•	•	•	•	•	•	•	•	•	•	•	16
Great Britain	GBR	•	•	•	H	•		•	•	•	•	•			H	•	•	•	•	•	•	•	•	•	•	•	•	•	•	•	H	•	•	•	30
Greece	GRE	H	•	•	•	•		•	•	•	•	•			•	•	•	•	•	•	•	•	•	•	•	•	•	•	H	•	•	•	•	•	30
Grenada	GRN																							•	•	•	•	•	•	•	•	•	•	•	11
Guam	GUM																								•	•	•	•	•	•	•	•	•	•	10
Guatemala	GUA															•				•	•	•	•	•	•	•	•	•	•	•	•	•	•	•	16
Guinea	GUI																			•			•	•	•	•	•	•	•	•	•	•	•	•	13
Guinea-Bissau	GBS																										•	•	•	•	•	•	•	•	8
Guyana	GUY														•	•	•	•	•	•	•		•	•	•	•	•	•	•	•	•	•	•	•	19
H	Code	96	00	04	08	12	16	20	24	28	32	36	40	44	48	52	56	60	64	68	72	76	80	84	88	92	96	00	04	08	12	16	20	24	Total
Haiti	HAI		•^{[F]}						•	•	•							•			•	•		•	•	•	•	•	•	•	•	•	•	•	17
Honduras	HON																			•		•		•	•	•	•	•	•	•	•	•	•	•	13
Hong Kong	HKG															•	•	•	•	•	•	•		•	•	•	•	•	•	•	•	•	•	•	18
Hungary	HUN	•	•	•	•	•			•	•	•	•			•	•	•	•	•	•	•	•	•		•	•	•	•	•	•	•	•	•	•	28
I	Code	96	00	04	08	12	16	20	24	28	32	36	40	44	48	52	56	60	64	68	72	76	80	84	88	92	96	00	04	08	12	16	20	24	Total
Iceland	ISL				•	•						•			•	•	•	•	•	•	•	•	•	•	•	•	•	•	•	•	•	•	•	•	22
India	IND		•					•	•	•	•	•			•	•	•	•	•	•	•	•	•	•	•	•	•	•	•	•	•	•	•	•	26
Indonesia	INA															•	•	•		•	•	•		•	•	•	•	•	•	•	•	•	•	•	17
Iran	IRI		•^{[G]}												•	•	•	•	•	•	•	•			•	•	•	•	•	•	•	•	•	•	18
Iraq	IRQ														•			•	•	•			•	•	•	•	•	•	•	•	•	•	•	•	16
Ireland	IRL	Great Britain						^{GBR}	•	•	•				•	•	•	•	•	•	•	•	•	•	•	•	•	•	•	•	•	•	•	•	23
Israel	ISR															•	•	•	•	•	•	•		•	•	•	•	•	•	•	•	•	•	•	18
Italy	ITA	•	•	^{[R]}	•	•		•	•	•	•	•			•	•	•	H	•	•	•	•	•	•	•	•	•	•	•	•	•	•	•	•	29
J	Code	96	00	04	08	12	16	20	24	28	32	36	40	44	48	52	56	60	64	68	72	76	80	84	88	92	96	00	04	08	12	16	20	24	Total
Jamaica	JAM														•	•	•	^{BWI}	•	•	•	•	•	•	•	•	•	•	•	•	•	•	•	•	19
British West Indies ^{[^]}	BWI																	•																	1
Japan	JPN					•		•	•	•	•	•				•	•	•	H	•	•	•		•	•	•	•	•	•	•	•	•	H	•	24
Jordan	JOR																						•	•	•	•	•	•	•	•	•	•	•	•	12
K	Code	96	00	04	08	12	16	20	24	28	32	36	40	44	48	52	56	60	64	68	72	76	80	84	88	92	96	00	04	08	12	16	20	24	Total
Kazakhstan	KAZ	Russian Empire						Soviet Union							Soviet Union											^{EUN}	•	•	•	•	•	•	•	•	8
Kenya	KEN																•	•	•	•	•			•	•	•	•	•	•	•	•	•	•	•	16
Kiribati	KIR																												•	•	•	•	•	•	6
North Korea	PRK					^{JPN}		Japan													•	•	•			•	•	•	•	•	•	•		•	11
South Korea	KOR					^{JPN}		Japan							•	•	•	•	•	•	•	•		•	H	•	•	•	•	•	•	•	•	•	19
Kosovo	KOS	Serbia						Yugoslavia							Yugoslavia											^{IOP}	SCG			^{SRB}		•	•	•	3
Kuwait	KUW																			•	•	•	•	•	•	•	•	•	•	•	•	^{[^]}	•	•	14
Kyrgyzstan	KGZ	Russian Empire						Soviet Union							Soviet Union											^{EUN}	•	•	•	•	•	•	•	•	8
L	Code	96	00	04	08	12	16	20	24	28	32	36	40	44	48	52	56	60	64	68	72	76	80	84	88	92	96	00	04	08	12	16	20	24	Total
Laos	LAO																						•		•	•	•	•	•	•	•	•	•	•	11
Latvia	LAT	Russian Empire							•	•	•	•			Soviet Union											•	•	•	•	•	•	•	•	•	13
Lebanon	LBN														•	•		•	•	•	•	•	•	•	•	•	•	•	•	•	•	•	•	•	19
Lesotho	LES																				•		•	•	•	•	•	•	•	•	•	•	•	•	13
Liberia	LBR																•	•	•		•		^{[Q]}	•	•		•	•	•	•	•	•	•	•	14
Libya	LBA																		^{[Q]}	•			•		•	•	•	•	•	•	•	•	•	•	12
Liechtenstein	LIE											•			•	•		•	•	•	•	•		•	•	•	•	•	•	•	•	•	•	•	19
Lithuania	LTU	Russian Empire							•	•					Soviet Union											•	•	•	•	•	•	•	•	•	11
Luxembourg	LUX		•^{[H]}			•		•	•	•		•			•	•	•	•	•	•	•	•	•	•	•	•	•	•	•	•	•	•	•	•	26
M	Code	96	00	04	08	12	16	20	24	28	32	36	40	44	48	52	56	60	64	68	72	76	80	84	88	92	96	00	04	08	12	16	20	24	Total
Madagascar	MAD																		•	•	•		•	•		•	•	•	•	•	•	•	•	•	14
Malawi	MAW																				•			•	•	•	•	•	•	•	•	•	•	•	12
Malaysia	MAS	MAL, NBO						MAL, NBO							MAL, NBO				•	•	•	•		•	•	•	•	•	•	•	•	•	•	•	15
Malaya ^{[^]}	MAL																•	•																	2
North Borneo ^{[^]}	NBO																•																		1
Maldives	MDV																								•	•	•	•	•	•	•	•	•	•	10
Mali	MLI																		•	•	•		•	•	•	•	•	•	•	•	•	•	•	•	15
Malta	MLT									•		•			•			•		•	•		•	•	•	•	•	•	•	•	•	•	•	•	18
Marshall Islands	MHL																													•	•	•	•	•	5
Mauritania	MTN																							•	•	•	•	•	•	•	•	•	•	•	11
Mauritius	MRI																							•	•	•	•	•	•	•	•	•	•	•	11
Mexico	MEX		•						•	•	•	•			•	•	•	•	•	H	•	•	•	•	•	•	•	•	•	•	•	•	•	•	25
Federated States of Micronesia	FSM																											•	•	•	•	•	•	•	7
Moldova	MDA	Russian Empire						Romania							Soviet Union											^{EUN}	•	•	•	•	•	•	•	•	8
Monaco	MON							•	•	•		•			•	•		•	•	•	•	•		•	•	•	•	•	•	•	•	•	•	•	22
Mongolia	MGL																		•	•	•	•	•		•	•	•	•	•	•	•	•	•	•	15
Montenegro	MNE							Yugoslavia							Yugoslavia											^{IOP}	SCG			•	•	•	•	•	5
Morocco	MAR																	•	•	•	•	•^{[P]}		•	•	•	•	•	•	•	•	•	•	•	16
Mozambique	MOZ																						•	•	•	•	•	•	•	•	•	•	•	•	12
Myanmar	MYA														•	•	•	•	•	•	•		•	•	•	•	•	•	•	•	•	•	•	•	19
N	Code	96	00	04	08	12	16	20	24	28	32	36	40	44	48	52	56	60	64	68	72	76	80	84	88	92	96	00	04	08	12	16	20	24	Total
Namibia	NAM									RSA					South Africa											•	•	•	•	•	•	•	•	•	9
Nauru	NRU																										•	•	•	•	•	•	•	•	8
Nepal	NEP																		•		•	•	•	•	•	•	•	•	•	•	•	•	•	•	15
Netherlands	NED		•		•	•		•	•	H	•	•			•	•	•^{[M]}	•	•	•	•	•	•	•	•	•	•	•	•	•	•	•	•	•	28
Netherlands Antilles ^{[^]}	AHO															•		•	•	•	•	•		•	•	•	•	•	•	•	^{[^]}				13
New Zealand	NZL		^{[I]}		ANZ			•	•	•	•	•			•	•	•	•	•	•	•	•	•	•	•	•	•	•	•	•	•	•	•	•	25
Nicaragua	NCA																			•	•	•	•	•		•	•	•	•	•	•	•	•	•	14
Niger	NIG																		•	•	•			•	•	•	•	•	•	•	•	•	•	•	14
Nigeria	NGR															•	•	•	•	•	•		•	•	•	•	•	•	•	•	•	•	•	•	18
North Macedonia	MKD	Serbia						Yugoslavia							Yugoslavia											^{IOP}	•	•	•	•	•	•	•	•	8
Norway	NOR		•	^{[L]}	•	•		•	•	•	•	•			•	•	•	•	•	•	•	•		•	•	•	•	•	•	•	•	•	•	•	27
O	Code	96	00	04	08	12	16	20	24	28	32	36	40	44	48	52	56	60	64	68	72	76	80	84	88	92	96	00	04	08	12	16	20	24	Total
Oman	OMA																							•	•	•	•	•	•	•	•	•	•	•	11
P	Code	96	00	04	08	12	16	20	24	28	32	36	40	44	48	52	56	60	64	68	72	76	80	84	88	92	96	00	04	08	12	16	20	24	Total
Pakistan	PAK	India						India							•	•	•	•	•	•	•	•		•	•	•	•	•	•	•	•	•	•	•	19
Palau	PLW																											•	•	•	•	•	•	•	7
Palestine	PLE																										•	•	•	•	•	•	•	•	8
Panama	PAN									•					•	•		•	•	•	•	•		•	•	•	•	•	•	•	•	•	•	•	19
Papua New Guinea	PNG																					•		•	•	•	•	•	•	•	•	•	•	•	12
Paraguay	PAR																			•	•	•		•	•	•	•	•	•	•	•	•	•	•	14
Peru	PER		•^{[J]}									•			•		•	•	•	•	•	•	•	•	•	•	•	•	•	•	•	•	•	•	20
Philippines	PHI								•	•	•	•			•	•	•	•	•	•	•	•		•	•	•	•	•	•	•	•	•	•	•	24
Poland	POL	RU1, AUT							•	•	•	•			•	•	•	•	•	•	•	•	•		•	•	•	•	•	•	•	•	•	•	23
Portugal	POR					•		•	•	•	•	•			•	•	•	•	•	•	•	•	•	•	•	•	•	•	•	•	•	•	•	•	26
Puerto Rico	PUR														•	•	•	•	•	•	•	•	•	•	•	•	•	•	•	•	•	•	•	•	20
Q	Code	96	00	04	08	12	16	20	24	28	32	36	40	44	48	52	56	60	64	68	72	76	80	84	88	92	96	00	04	08	12	16	20	24	Total
Qatar	QAT																							•	•	•	•	•	•	•	•	•	•	•	11
R	Code	96	00	04	08	12	16	20	24	28	32	36	40	44	48	52	56	60	64	68	72	76	80	84	88	92	96	00	04	08	12	16	20	24	Total
Romania	ROU		•						•	•		•				•	•	•	•	•	•	•	•	•	•	•	•	•	•	•	•	•	•	•	23
Russia	RUS	Russian Empire						Soviet Union							Soviet Union											^{EUN}	•	•	•	•	•	•	^{ROC}	^{AIN}	6
Russian Empire ^{[^]}	RU1		•		•	•																													3
Soviet Union ^{[^]}	URS															•	•	•	•	•	•	•	H		•	^{EUN}									9
Unified Team ^{[^]}	EUN																									•									1
ROC ^{[^]}	ROC																																•		1
Individual Neutral Athletes ^{[^]}	AIN																																	•	1
Rwanda	RWA																							•	•	•	•	•	•	•	•	•	•	•	11
S	Code	96	00	04	08	12	16	20	24	28	32	36	40	44	48	52	56	60	64	68	72	76	80	84	88	92	96	00	04	08	12	16	20	24	Total
Saint Kitts and Nevis	SKN																										•	•	•	•	•	•	•	•	8
Saint Lucia	LCA																										•	•	•	•	•	•	•	•	8
Saint Vincent and the Grenadines	VIN																								•	•	•	•	•	•	•	•	•	•	10
Samoa	SAM																							•	•	•	•	•	•	•	•	•	•	•	11
San Marino	SMR																	•		•	•	•	•	•	•	•	•	•	•	•	•	•	•	•	16
São Tomé and Príncipe	STP																										•	•	•	•	•	•	•	•	8
Saudi Arabia	KSA																				•	•		•	•	•	•	•	•	•	•	•	•	•	13
Senegal	SEN																		•	•	•	•	•	•	•	•	•	•	•	•	•	•	•	•	16
Serbia	SRB					•		Yugoslavia							Yugoslavia											^{IOP}	SCG			•	•	•	•	•	6
Yugoslavia ^{[^]}	YUG							•	•	•	•	•			•	•	•	•	•	•	•	•	•	•	•										16
Independent Olympic Participants ^{[^]}	IOP																									•									1
Serbia and Montenegro ^{[^]}	SCG																										•	•	•						3
Seychelles	SEY																						•	•		•	•	•	•	•	•	•	•	•	11
Sierra Leone	SLE																			•			•	•	•	•	•	•	•	•	•	•	•	•	13
Singapore	SGP														•	•	•	•	^{[O]}	•	•	•		•	•	•	•	•	•	•	•	•	•	•	18
Slovakia	SVK	Hungary						Czechoslovakia							Czechoslovakia												•	•	•	•	•	•	•	•	8
Czechoslovakia ^{[^]}	TCH							•	•	•	•	•			•	•	•	•	•	•	•	•	•		•	•									16
Slovenia	SLO	Austria/Hungary						Yugoslavia							Yugoslavia											•	•	•	•	•	•	•	•	•	9
Solomon Islands	SOL																							•	•	•	•	•	•	•	•	•	•	•	11
Somalia	SOM																				•			•	•		•	•	•	•	•	•	•	•	11
South Africa	RSA			•^{[S]}	•	•		•	•	•	•	•			•	•	•	•								•	•	•	•	•	•	•	•	•	21
South Sudan	SSD	Sudan						Sudan							Sudan																^{[^]}	•	•	•	3
Spain	ESP		•					•	•	•	•				•	•	•^{[M]}	•	•	•	•	•	•	•	•	H	•	•	•	•	•	•	•	•	25
Sri Lanka	SRI														•	•	•	•	•	•	•		•	•	•	•	•	•	•	•	•	•	•	•	19
Sudan	SUD																	•		•	•			•	•	•	•	•	•	•	•	•	•	•	14
Suriname	SUR																	^{[Q]}		•	•	•		•	•	•	•	•	•	•	•	•	•	•	14
Sweden	SWE	•	•		•	H		•	•	•	•	•			•	•	•	•	•	•	•	•	•	•	•	•	•	•	•	•	•	•	•	•	29
Switzerland	SUI	•	•	•	•	•		•	•	•	•	•			•	•	•^{[M]}	•	•	•	•	•	•	•	•	•	•	•	•	•	•	•	•	•	30
Syria	SYR														•			^{[N]}		•	•		•	•	•	•	•	•	•	•	•	•	•	•	15
T	Code	96	00	04	08	12	16	20	24	28	32	36	40	44	48	52	56	60	64	68	72	76	80	84	88	92	96	00	04	08	12	16	20	24	Total
Tajikistan	TJK	Russian Empire						Soviet Union							Soviet Union											^{EUN}	•	•	•	•	•	•	•	•	8
Tanzania	TAN																		•	•	•		•	•	•	•	•	•	•	•	•	•	•	•	15
Thailand	THA															•	•	•	•	•	•	•		•	•	•	•	•	•	•	•	•	•	•	18
Timor-Leste	TLS																					Indonesia						^{[^]}	•	•	•	•	•	•	6
Togo	TOG																				•			•	•	•	•	•	•	•	•	•	•	•	12
Tonga	TGA																							•	•	•	•	•	•	•	•	•	•	•	11
Trinidad and Tobago	TTO														•	•	•	^{BWI}	•	•	•	•	•	•	•	•	•	•	•	•	•	•	•	•	19
British West Indies ^{[^]}	BWI																	•																	1
Tunisia	TUN																	•	•	•	•	•^{[P]}		•	•	•	•	•	•	•	•	•	•	•	16
Turkey	TUR				•	•			•	•		•			•	•	•	•	•	•	•	•		•	•	•	•	•	•	•	•	•	•	•	24
Turkmenistan	TKM	Russian Empire						Soviet Union							Soviet Union											^{EUN}	•	•	•	•	•	•	•	•	8
Tuvalu	TUV																													•	•	•	•	•	5
U	Code	96	00	04	08	12	16	20	24	28	32	36	40	44	48	52	56	60	64	68	72	76	80	84	88	92	96	00	04	08	12	16	20	24	Total
Uganda	UGA																•	•	•	•	•		•	•	•	•	•	•	•	•	•	•	•	•	17
Ukraine	UKR	Russian Empire						Soviet Union							Soviet Union											^{EUN}	•	•	•	•	•	•	•	•	8
United Arab Emirates	UAE																							•	•	•	•	•	•	•	•	•	•	•	11
United States	USA	•	•	H	•	•		•	•	•	H	•			•	•	•	•	•	•	•	•		H	•	•	H	•	•	•	•	•	•	•	29
Uruguay	URU								•	•	•	•			•	•	•	•	•	•	•	•		•	•	•	•	•	•	•	•	•	•	•	23
Uzbekistan	UZB	Russian Empire						Soviet Union							Soviet Union											^{EUN}	•	•	•	•	•	•	•	•	8
V	Code	96	00	04	08	12	16	20	24	28	32	36	40	44	48	52	56	60	64	68	72	76	80	84	88	92	96	00	04	08	12	16	20	24	Total
Vanuatu	VAN																								•	•	•	•	•	•	•	•	•	•	10
Venezuela	VEN														•	•	•	•	•	•	•	•	•	•	•	•	•	•	•	•	•	•	•	•	20
Vietnam	VIE															•	•	•	•	•	•		•		•	•	•	•	•	•	•	•	•	•	17
Virgin Islands	ISV																			•	•	•		•	•	•	•	•	•	•	•	•	•	•	14
Y	Code	96	00	04	08	12	16	20	24	28	32	36	40	44	48	52	56	60	64	68	72	76	80	84	88	92	96	00	04	08	12	16	20	24	Total
Yemen	YEM	YAR, YMD						YAR, YMD							North Yemen, South Yemen											•	•	•	•	•	•	•	•	•	9
North Yemen ^{[^]}	YAR																							•	•										2
South Yemen ^{[^]}	YMD																								•										1
Z	Code	96	00	04	08	12	16	20	24	28	32	36	40	44	48	52	56	60	64	68	72	76	80	84	88	92	96	00	04	08	12	16	20	24	Total
Zambia	ZAM																		•	•	•		•	•	•	•	•	•	•	•	•	•	•	•	15
Zimbabwe	ZIM	Rhodesia						Rhodesia							Rhodesia								•	•	•	•	•	•	•	•	•	•	•	•	12
Rhodesia ^{[^]}	RHO									•								•	•																3
Other entries	Code	96	00	04	08	12	16	20	24	28	32	36	40	44	48	52	56	60	64	68	72	76	80	84	88	92	96	00	04	08	12	16	20	24	Total
Mixed team ^{[^]}	ZZX																																		3
Independent Olympic Athletes ^{[^]}	IOA																																		3
Refugee Olympic Team ^{[^]}	EOR																																		3
Total NOCs number		14	25	12	22	28	-	29	44	46	37	49	-	-	59	69	72	83	93	112	121	92	80	140	159	169	197	199	201	204	204	206	205	206	3177

=== First Appearance lists ===
Contents:	Early Games | Between wars | Post-war | 70s & 80s | 90s & 2000s | Recent Games

Early Games
NOC	Code	96	00	04	08	12	16	20	24	28	32	36	40	44	48	52	56	60	64	68	72	76	80	84	88	92	96	00	04	08	12	16	20	24	Total
Greece	GRE	H	•	•	•	•		•	•	•	•	•			•	•	•	•	•	•	•	•	•	•	•	•	•	•	H	•	•	•	•	•	30
Great Britain	GBR	•	•	•	H	•		•	•	•	•	•			H	•	•	•	•	•	•	•	•	•	•	•	•	•	•	•	H	•	•	•	30
Switzerland	SUI	•	•	•	•	•		•	•	•	•	•			•	•	•^{[M]}	•	•	•	•	•	•	•	•	•	•	•	•	•	•	•	•	•	30
United States	USA	•	•	H	•	•		•	•	•	H	•			•	•	•	•	•	•	•	•		H	•	•	H	•	•	•	•	•	•	•	29
Austria	AUT	•	•	•	•	•			•	•	•	•			•	•	•	•	•	•	•	•	•	•	•	•	•	•	•	•	•	•	•	•	29
Denmark	DEN	•	•		•	•		•	•	•	•	•			•	•	•	•	•	•	•	•	•	•	•	•	•	•	•	•	•	•	•	•	29
France	FRA	•	H	^{[K]}	•	•		•	H	•	•	•			•	•	•	•	•	•	•	•	•	•	•	•	•	•	•	•	•	•	•	H	29
Italy	ITA	•	•	^{[R]}	•	•		•	•	•	•	•			•	•	•	H	•	•	•	•	•	•	•	•	•	•	•	•	•	•	•	•	29
Sweden	SWE	•	•		•	H		•	•	•	•	•			•	•	•	•	•	•	•	•	•	•	•	•	•	•	•	•	•	•	•	•	29
Australia	AUS	•	•	•	ANZ			•	•	•	•	•			•	•	H	•	•	•	•	•	•	•	•	•	•	H	•	•	•	•	•	•	28
Hungary	HUN	•	•	•	•	•			•	•	•	•			•	•	•	•	•	•	•	•	•		•	•	•	•	•	•	•	•	•	•	28
Chile	CHI	•^{[B]}				•		•	•	•		•			•	•	•	•	•	•	•	•		•	•	•	•	•	•	•	•	•	•	•	25
Bulgaria	BUL	•^{[A]}							•	•		•				•	•	•	•	•	•	•	•		•	•	•	•	•	•	•	•	•	•	22
Germany	GER	•	•	•	•	•				•	•	H				•	EUA			GDR, FRG						•	•	•	•	•	•	•	•	•	18
Mixed team ^{[^]}	ZZX																																		3
NOC	Code	96	00	04	08	12	16	20	24	28	32	36	40	44	48	52	56	60	64	68	72	76	80	84	88	92	96	00	04	08	12	16	20	24	Total
Canada	CAN		•	•	•	•		•	•	•	•	•			•	•	•	•	•	•	•	H		•	•	•	•	•	•	•	•	•	•	•	28
Belgium	BEL		•		•	•		H	•	•	•	•			•	•	•	•	•	•	•	•	•	•	•	•	•	•	•	•	•	•	•	•	28
Netherlands	NED		•		•	•		•	•	H	•	•			•	•	•^{[M]}	•	•	•	•	•	•	•	•	•	•	•	•	•	•	•	•	•	28
Norway	NOR		•	^{[L]}	•	•		•	•	•	•	•			•	•	•	•	•	•	•	•		•	•	•	•	•	•	•	•	•	•	•	27
Argentina	ARG		•		•			•	•	•	•	•			•	•	•	•	•	•	•	•		•	•	•	•	•	•	•	•	•	•	•	26
Luxembourg	LUX		•^{[H]}			•		•	•	•		•			•	•	•	•	•	•	•	•	•	•	•	•	•	•	•	•	•	•	•	•	26
India	IND		•					•	•	•	•	•			•	•	•	•	•	•	•	•	•	•	•	•	•	•	•	•	•	•	•	•	26
Spain	ESP		•					•	•	•	•				•	•	•^{[M]}	•	•	•	•	•	•	•	•	H	•	•	•	•	•	•	•	•	25
Mexico	MEX		•						•	•	•	•			•	•	•	•	•	H	•	•	•	•	•	•	•	•	•	•	•	•	•	•	25
Romania	ROU		•						•	•		•				•	•	•	•	•	•	•	•	•	•	•	•	•	•	•	•	•	•	•	23
Cuba	CUB		•	•					•	•					•	•	•	•	•	•	•	•	•			•	•	•	•	•	•	•	•	•	22
Peru	PER		•^{[J]}									•			•		•	•	•	•	•	•	•	•	•	•	•	•	•	•	•	•	•	•	20
Iran	IRI		•^{[G]}												•	•	•	•	•	•	•	•			•	•	•	•	•	•	•	•	•	•	18
Haiti	HAI		•^{[F]}						•	•	•							•			•	•		•	•	•	•	•	•	•	•	•	•	•	17
Bohemia ^{[^]}	BOH		•		•	•																													3
Russian Empire ^{[^]}	RU1		•		•	•																													3
NOC	Code	96	00	04	08	12	16	20	24	28	32	36	40	44	48	52	56	60	64	68	72	76	80	84	88	92	96	00	04	08	12	16	20	24	Total
South Africa	RSA			•^{[S]}	•	•		•	•	•	•	•			•	•	•	•								•	•	•	•	•	•	•	•	•	21
NOC	Code	96	00	04	08	12	16	20	24	28	32	36	40	44	48	52	56	60	64	68	72	76	80	84	88	92	96	00	04	08	12	16	20	24	Total
Finland	FIN	RU1			•	•		•	•	•	•	•			•	H	•	•	•	•	•	•	•	•	•	•	•	•	•	•	•	•	•	•	27
Turkey	TUR				•	•			•	•		•			•	•	•	•	•	•	•	•		•	•	•	•	•	•	•	•	•	•	•	24
Iceland	ISL				•	•						•			•	•	•	•	•	•	•	•	•	•	•	•	•	•	•	•	•	•	•	•	22
Australasia ^{[^]}	ANZ				•	•																													2
NOC	Code	96	00	04	08	12	16	20	24	28	32	36	40	44	48	52	56	60	64	68	72	76	80	84	88	92	96	00	04	08	12	16	20	24	Total
Portugal	POR					•		•	•	•	•	•			•	•	•	•	•	•	•	•	•	•	•	•	•	•	•	•	•	•	•	•	26
Japan	JPN					•		•	•	•	•	•				•	•	•	H	•	•	•		•	•	•	•	•	•	•	•	•	H	•	24
Egypt	EGY	^{[C]}				•		•	•	•		•			•	•	•^{[M]}	•	•	•	•	•^{[P]}		•	•	•	•	•	•	•	•	•	•	•	24
Serbia	SRB					•		Yugoslavia							Yugoslavia											^{IOP}	SCG			•	•	•	•	•	6
Total NOCs number		14	25	12	23	28	-	23	31	32	25	31	-	-	30	33	33	34	32	32	33	33	23	29	32	35	35	35	35	36	36	36	36	36	908

Between wars
NOC	Code	20	24	28	32	36	40	44	48	52	56	60	64	68	72	76	80	84	88	92	96	00	04	08	12	16	20	24	Total
New Zealand	NZL	•	•	•	•	•			•	•	•	•	•	•	•	•	•	•	•	•	•	•	•	•	•	•	•	•	25
Brazil	BRA	•^{[D]}	•		•	•			•	•	•	•	•	•	•	•	•	•	•	•	•	•	•	•	•	H	•	•	24
Monaco	MON	•	•	•		•			•	•		•	•	•	•	•		•	•	•	•	•	•	•	•	•	•	•	22
Czechoslovakia ^{[^]}	TCH	•	•	•	•	•			•	•	•	•	•	•	•	•	•		•	•									16
Yugoslavia ^{[^]}	YUG	•	•	•	•	•			•	•	•	•	•	•	•	•	•	•	•										16
Estonia	EST	•	•	•	•	•			Soviet Union											•	•	•	•	•	•	•	•	•	14
NOC	Code	20	24	28	32	36	40	44	48	52	56	60	64	68	72	76	80	84	88	92	96	00	04	08	12	16	20	24	Total
Poland	POL		•	•	•	•			•	•	•	•	•	•	•	•	•		•	•	•	•	•	•	•	•	•	•	23
Philippines	PHI		•	•	•	•			•	•	•	•	•	•	•	•		•	•	•	•	•	•	•	•	•	•	•	23
Uruguay	URU		•	•	•	•			•	•	•	•	•	•	•	•		•	•	•	•	•	•	•	•	•	•	•	23
Ireland	IRL	^{GBR}	•	•	•				•	•	•	•	•	•	•	•	•	•	•	•	•	•	•	•	•	•	•	•	23
Ecuador	ECU		•											•	•	•	•	•	•	•	•	•	•	•	•	•	•	•	16
Latvia	LAT		•	•	•	•			Soviet Union											•	•	•	•	•	•	•	•	•	13
Lithuania	LTU		•	•					Soviet Union											•	•	•	•	•	•	•	•	•	11
Republic of China ^{[^]}	ROC		•		•	•			•																				3
NOC	Code	20	24	28	32	36	40	44	48	52	56	60	64	68	72	76	80	84	88	92	96	00	04	08	12	16	20	24	Total
Panama	PAN			•					•	•		•	•	•	•	•		•	•	•	•	•	•	•	•	•	•	•	19
Malta	MLT			•		•			•			•		•	•		•	•	•	•	•	•	•	•	•	•	•	•	18
Rhodesia ^{[^]}	RHO			•								•	•																3
NOC	Code	20	24	28	32	36	40	44	48	52	56	60	64	68	72	76	80	84	88	92	96	00	04	08	12	16	20	24	Total
Colombia	COL	^{[E]}			•	•			•		•	•	•	•	•	•	•	•	•	•	•	•	•	•	•	•	•	•	21
NOC	Code	20	24	28	32	36	40	44	48	52	56	60	64	68	72	76	80	84	88	92	96	00	04	08	12	16	20	24	Total
Bermuda	BER					•			•	•	•	•	•	•	•	•		•	•	•	•	•	•	•	•	•	•	•	20
Liechtenstein	LIE					•			•	•		•	•	•	•	•		•	•	•	•	•	•	•	•	•	•	•	19
Costa Rica	CRC					•							•	•	•	•	•	•	•	•	•	•	•	•	•	•	•	•	17
Afghanistan	AFG					•			•		•	•	•	•	•		•		•		•		•	•	•	•	•	•	16
Bolivia	BOL					•							•	•	•	•		•	•	•	•	•	•	•	•	•	•	•	16
Total NOCs number		6	14	14	12	18	-	-	16	12	11	16	17	18	18	16	11	15	18	19	19	18	19	19	19	19	19	19	402

Post-war
NOC	Code	48	52	56	60	64	68	72	76	80	84	88	92	96	00	04	08	12	16	20	24	Total
Puerto Rico	PUR	•	•	•	•	•	•	•	•	•	•	•	•	•	•	•	•	•	•	•	•	20
Venezuela	VEN	•	•	•	•	•	•	•	•	•	•	•	•	•	•	•	•	•	•	•	•	20
South Korea	KOR	•	•	•	•	•	•	•	•		•	H	•	•	•	•	•	•	•	•	•	19
Pakistan	PAK	•	•	•	•	•	•	•	•		•	•	•	•	•	•	•	•	•	•	•	19
Guyana	GUY	•	•	•	•	•	•	•		•	•	•	•	•	•	•	•	•	•	•	•	19
Myanmar	MYA	•	•	•	•	•	•	•		•	•	•	•	•	•	•	•	•	•	•	•	19
Sri Lanka	SRI	•	•	•	•	•	•	•		•	•	•	•	•	•	•	•	•	•	•	•	19
Jamaica	JAM	•	•	•	^{BWI}	•	•	•	•	•	•	•	•	•	•	•	•	•	•	•	•	19
Trinidad and Tobago	TTO	•	•	•	^{BWI}	•	•	•	•	•	•	•	•	•	•	•	•	•	•	•	•	19
Lebanon	LBN	•	•		•	•	•	•	•	•	•	•	•	•	•	•	•	•	•	•	•	19
Singapore	SGP	•	•	•	•	^{[O]}	•	•	•		•	•	•	•	•	•	•	•	•	•	•	18
Iraq	IRQ	•			•	•	•			•	•	•	•	•	•	•	•	•	•	•	•	16
Syria	SYR	•			^{[N]}		•	•		•	•	•	•	•	•	•	•	•	•	•	•	15
NOC	Code	48	52	56	60	64	68	72	76	80	84	88	92	96	00	04	08	12	16	20	24	Total
Bahamas	BAH		•	•	•	•	•	•	•		•	•	•	•	•	•	•	•	•	•	•	18
Hong Kong	HKG		•	•	•	•	•	•	•		•	•	•	•	•	•	•	•	•	•	•	18
Israel	ISR		•	•	•	•	•	•	•		•	•	•	•	•	•	•	•	•	•	•	18
Thailand	THA		•	•	•	•	•	•	•		•	•	•	•	•	•	•	•	•	•	•	18
Nigeria	NGR		•	•	•	•	•	•		•	•	•	•	•	•	•	•	•	•	•	•	18
Vietnam	VIE		•	•	•	•	•	•		•		•	•	•	•	•	•	•	•	•	•	17
Indonesia	INA		•	•	•		•	•	•		•	•	•	•	•	•	•	•	•	•	•	17
Ghana	GHA		•		•	•	•	•			•	•	•	•	•	•	•	•	•	•	•	16
Guatemala	GUA		•				•	•	•	•	•	•	•	•	•	•	•	•	•	•	•	16
Netherlands Antilles ^{[^]}	AHO		•		•	•	•	•	•		•	•	•	•	•	•	•	^{[^]}				13
China	CHN	^{ROC}	•								•	•	•	•	•	•	H	•	•	•	•	12
Soviet Union ^{[^]}	URS		•	•	•	•	•	•	•	H		•	^{EUN}									9
Saar ^{[^]}	SAA		•																			1
NOC	Code	48	52	56	60	64	68	72	76	80	84	88	92	96	00	04	08	12	16	20	24	Total
Chinese Taipei (Taiwan)	TPE	^{ROC}		•	•	•	•	•			•	•	•	•	•	•	•	•	•	•	•	18
Uganda	UGA			•	•	•	•	•		•	•	•	•	•	•	•	•	•	•	•	•	17
Fiji	FIJ			•	•		•	•	•		•	•	•	•	•	•	•	•	•	•	•	16
Kenya	KEN			•	•	•	•	•			•	•	•	•	•	•	•	•	•	•	•	16
Ethiopia	ETH			•	•	•	•	•		•			•	•	•	•	•	•	•	•	•	15
Liberia	LBR			•	•	•		•		^{[Q]}	•	•		•	•	•	•	•	•	•	•	14
Cambodia	CAM			•^{[M]}		•		•						•	•	•	•	•	•	•	•	11
United Team of Germany ^{[^]}	EUA			•	•	•																3
Malaya ^{[^]}	MAL			•	•																	2
North Borneo ^{[^]}	NBO			•																		1
NOC	Code	48	52	56	60	64	68	72	76	80	84	88	92	96	00	04	08	12	16	20	24	Total
Morocco	MAR				•	•	•	•	•^{[P]}		•	•	•	•	•	•	•	•	•	•	•	16
Tunisia	TUN				•	•	•	•	•^{[P]}		•	•	•	•	•	•	•	•	•	•	•	16
San Marino	SMR				•		•	•	•	•	•	•	•	•	•	•	•	•	•	•	•	16
Sudan	SUD				•		•	•			•	•	•	•	•	•	•	•	•	•	•	14
British West Indies ^{[^]}	BWI				•																	1
NOC	Code	48	52	56	60	64	68	72	76	80	84	88	92	96	00	04	08	12	16	20	24	Total
Cameroon	CMR					•	•	•	•^{[P]}	•	•	•	•	•	•	•	•	•	•	•	•	16
Dominican Republic	DOM					•	•	•	•	•	•	•	•	•	•	•	•	•	•	•	•	16
Senegal	SEN					•	•	•	•	•	•	•	•	•	•	•	•	•	•	•	•	16
Mongolia	MGL					•	•	•	•	•		•	•	•	•	•	•	•	•	•	•	15
Ivory Coast	CIV					•	•	•	•		•	•	•	•	•	•	•	•	•	•	•	15
Malaysia	MAS	MAL, NBO				•	•	•	•		•	•	•	•	•	•	•	•	•	•	•	15
Algeria	ALG	France				•	•	•		•	•	•	•	•	•	•	•	•	•	•	•	15
Mali	MLI					•	•	•		•	•	•	•	•	•	•	•	•	•	•	•	15
Tanzania	TAN					•	•	•		•	•	•	•	•	•	•	•	•	•	•	•	15
Zambia	ZAM					•	•	•		•	•	•	•	•	•	•	•	•	•	•	•	15
Nepal	NEP					•		•	•	•	•	•	•	•	•	•	•	•	•	•	•	15
Madagascar	MAD					•	•	•		•	•		•	•	•	•	•	•	•	•	•	14
Chad	CHA					•	•	•			•	•	•	•	•	•	•	•	•	•	•	14
Niger	NIG					•	•	•			•	•	•	•	•	•	•	•	•	•	•	14
Republic of the Congo	CGO					•		•		•	•	•	•	•	•	•	•	•	•	•	•	14
NOC	Code	48	52	56	60	64	68	72	76	80	84	88	92	96	00	04	08	12	16	20	24	Total
Kuwait	KUW						•	•	•	•	•	•	•	•	•	•	•	•	^{[^]}	•	•	14
Nicaragua	NCA						•	•	•	•	•		•	•	•	•	•	•	•	•	•	14
Barbados	BAR				^{BWI}		•	•	•		•	•	•	•	•	•	•	•	•	•	•	14
Belize	BIZ						•	•	•		•	•	•	•	•	•	•	•	•	•	•	14
Paraguay	PAR						•	•	•		•	•	•	•	•	•	•	•	•	•	•	14
Suriname	SUR				^{[Q]}		•	•	•		•	•	•	•	•	•	•	•	•	•	•	14
Virgin Islands	ISV						•	•	•		•	•	•	•	•	•	•	•	•	•	•	14
El Salvador	ESA						•	•			•	•	•	•	•	•	•	•	•	•	•	13
Honduras	HON						•		•		•	•	•	•	•	•	•	•	•	•	•	13
Guinea	GUI						•			•	•	•	•	•	•	•	•	•	•	•	•	13
Sierra Leone	SLE						•			•	•	•	•	•	•	•	•	•	•	•	•	13
Libya	LBA					^{[Q]}	•			•		•	•	•	•	•	•	•	•	•	•	12
Central African Republic	CAF						•				•	•	•	•	•	•	•	•	•	•	•	12
Democratic Republic of the Congo	COD						•				•	•	•	•	•	•	•	•	•	•	•	12
East Germany ^{[^]}	GDR			EUA			•	•	•	•		•										5
West Germany ^{[^]}	FRG			EUA			•	H	•		•	•										5
Total NOCs number		13	24	28	33	44	62	59	37	34	60	63	62	64	64	64	64	63	62	63	63	1026

70s & 80s
NOC	Code	72	76	80	84	88	92	96	00	04	08	12	16	20	24	Total
Saudi Arabia	KSA	•	•		•	•	•	•	•	•	•	•	•	•	•	13
Benin	BEN	•		•	•	•	•	•	•	•	•	•	•	•	•	13
Lesotho	LES	•		•	•	•	•	•	•	•	•	•	•	•	•	13
Eswatini	SWZ	•			•	•	•	•	•	•	•	•	•	•	•	12
Gabon	GAB	•			•	•	•	•	•	•	•	•	•	•	•	12
Malawi	MAW	•			•	•	•	•	•	•	•	•	•	•	•	12
Togo	TOG	•			•	•	•	•	•	•	•	•	•	•	•	12
North Korea	PRK	•	•	•			•	•	•	•	•	•	•		•	11
Somalia	SOM	•			•	•		•	•	•	•	•	•	•	•	11
Burkina Faso	BUR	•				•	•	•	•	•	•	•	•	•	•	11
Albania	ALB	•					•	•	•	•	•	•	•	•	•	10
NOC	Code	72	76	80	84	88	92	96	00	04	08	12	16	20	24	Total
Andorra	AND		•	•	•	•	•	•	•	•	•	•	•	•	•	13
Antigua and Barbuda	ANT		•		•	•	•	•	•	•	•	•	•	•	•	12
Cayman Islands	CAY		•		•	•	•	•	•	•	•	•	•	•	•	12
Papua New Guinea	PNG		•		•	•	•	•	•	•	•	•	•	•	•	12
NOC	Code	72	76	80	84	88	92	96	00	04	08	12	16	20	24	Total
Zimbabwe	ZIM	RHO		•	•	•	•	•	•	•	•	•	•	•	•	12
Botswana	BOT			•	•	•	•	•	•	•	•	•	•	•	•	12
Cyprus	CYP			•	•	•	•	•	•	•	•	•	•	•	•	12
Jordan	JOR			•	•	•	•	•	•	•	•	•	•	•	•	12
Mozambique	MOZ			•	•	•	•	•	•	•	•	•	•	•	•	12
Seychelles	SEY			•	•		•	•	•	•	•	•	•	•	•	11
Angola	ANG			•		•	•	•	•	•	•	•	•	•	•	11
Laos	LAO			•		•	•	•	•	•	•	•	•	•	•	11
NOC	Code	72	76	80	84	88	92	96	00	04	08	12	16	20	24	Total
Bahrain	BRN				•	•	•	•	•	•	•	•	•	•	•	11
Bangladesh	BAN				•	•	•	•	•	•	•	•	•	•	•	11
Bhutan	BHU				•	•	•	•	•	•	•	•	•	•	•	11
British Virgin Islands	IVB				•	•	•	•	•	•	•	•	•	•	•	11
Equatorial Guinea	GEQ				•	•	•	•	•	•	•	•	•	•	•	11
The Gambia	GAM				•	•	•	•	•	•	•	•	•	•	•	11
Grenada	GRN				•	•	•	•	•	•	•	•	•	•	•	11
Mauritania	MTN				•	•	•	•	•	•	•	•	•	•	•	11
Mauritius	MRI				•	•	•	•	•	•	•	•	•	•	•	11
Oman	OMA				•	•	•	•	•	•	•	•	•	•	•	11
Qatar	QAT				•	•	•	•	•	•	•	•	•	•	•	11
Rwanda	RWA				•	•	•	•	•	•	•	•	•	•	•	11
Samoa	SAM				•	•	•	•	•	•	•	•	•	•	•	11
Solomon Islands	SOL				•	•	•	•	•	•	•	•	•	•	•	11
Tonga	TGA				•	•	•	•	•	•	•	•	•	•	•	11
United Arab Emirates	UAE				•	•	•	•	•	•	•	•	•	•	•	11
Djibouti	DJI				•	•	•	•	•	^{[Q]}	•	•	•	•	•	10
North Yemen ^{[^]}	YAR				•	•										2
NOC	Code	72	76	80	84	88	92	96	00	04	08	12	16	20	24	Total
American Samoa	ASA					•	•	•	•	•	•	•	•	•	•	10
Aruba	ARU	AHO				•	•	•	•	•	•	•	•	•	•	10
Cook Islands	COK					•	•	•	•	•	•	•	•	•	•	10
Guam	GUM					•	•	•	•	•	•	•	•	•	•	10
Maldives	MDV					•	•	•	•	•	•	•	•	•	•	10
Saint Vincent and the Grenadines	VIN					•	•	•	•	•	•	•	•	•	•	10
Vanuatu	VAN					•	•	•	•	•	•	•	•	•	•	10
South Yemen ^{[^]}	YMD					•										1
Total NOCs number		11	6	12	36	46	46	47	47	46	47	47	47	46	47	531

90s & 2000s
NOC	Code	92	96	00	04	08	12	16	20	24	Total
Bosnia and Herzegovina	BIH	•	•	•	•	•	•	•	•	•	9
Croatia	CRO	•	•	•	•	•	•	•	•	•	9
Namibia	NAM	•	•	•	•	•	•	•	•	•	9
Slovenia	SLO	•	•	•	•	•	•	•	•	•	9
Yemen	YEM	•	•	•	•	•	•	•	•	•	9
Unified Team ^{[^]}	EUN	•									1
Independent Olympic Participants ^{[^]}	IOP	•									1
NOC	Code	92	96	00	04	08	12	16	20	24	Total
Armenia	ARM	^{EUN}	•	•	•	•	•	•	•	•	8
Azerbaijan	AZE	^{EUN}	•	•	•	•	•	•	•	•	8
Burundi	BDI		•	•	•	•	•	•	•	•	8
Cape Verde	CPV		•	•	•	•	•	•	•	•	8
Comoros	COM		•	•	•	•	•	•	•	•	8
Czech Republic	CZE	^{TCH}	•	•	•	•	•	•	•	•	8
Dominica	DMA		•	•	•	•	•	•	•	•	8
Georgia	GEO	^{EUN}	•	•	•	•	•	•	•	•	8
Guinea-Bissau	GBS		•	•	•	•	•	•	•	•	8
Kazakhstan	KAZ	^{EUN}	•	•	•	•	•	•	•	•	8
Kyrgyzstan	KGZ	^{EUN}	•	•	•	•	•	•	•	•	8
Moldova	MDA	^{EUN}	•	•	•	•	•	•	•	•	8
Nauru	NRU		•	•	•	•	•	•	•	•	8
North Macedonia	MKD	^{IOP}	•	•	•	•	•	•	•	•	8
Palestine	PLE		•	•	•	•	•	•	•	•	8
Saint Kitts and Nevis	SKN		•	•	•	•	•	•	•	•	8
Saint Lucia	LCA		•	•	•	•	•	•	•	•	8
São Tomé and Príncipe	STP		•	•	•	•	•	•	•	•	8
Slovakia	SVK	^{TCH}	•	•	•	•	•	•	•	•	8
Tajikistan	TJK	^{EUN}	•	•	•	•	•	•	•	•	8
Turkmenistan	TKM	^{EUN}	•	•	•	•	•	•	•	•	8
Ukraine	UKR	^{EUN}	•	•	•	•	•	•	•	•	8
Uzbekistan	UZB	^{EUN}	•	•	•	•	•	•	•	•	8
Belarus	BLR	^{EUN}	•	•	•	•	•	•	•	^{AIN}	7
Brunei	BRU	^{[Q]}	•	•	•		•	•	•	•	7
Russia	RUS	^{EUN}	•	•	•	•	•	•	^{ROC}	^{AIN}	6
Serbia and Montenegro ^{[^]}	SCG		•	•	•						3
NOC	Code	92	96	00	04	08	12	16	20	24	Total
Eritrea	ERI	^{ETH}		•	•	•	•	•	•	•	7
Federated States of Micronesia	FSM			•	•	•	•	•	•	•	7
Palau	PLW			•	•	•	•	•	•	•	7
NOC	Code	92	96	00	04	08	12	16	20	24	Total
Kiribati	KIR				•	•	•	•	•	•	6
Timor-Leste	TLS	INA		^{[^]}	•	•	•	•	•	•	6
NOC	Code	92	96	00	04	08	12	16	20	24	Total
Marshall Islands	MHL					•	•	•	•	•	5
Montenegro	MNE	^{IOP}	SCG			•	•	•	•	•	5
Tuvalu	TUV					•	•	•	•	•	5
Total NOCs number		7	32	35	37	38	39	39	38	37	302

Recent Games
NOC	Code	12	16	20	24	Total
Kosovo	KOS		•	•	•	3
South Sudan	SSD	^{[^]}	•	•	•	3
Refugee Olympic Team ^{[^]}	EOR					3
ROC ^{[^]}	ROC			•		1
Individual Neutral Athletes ^{[^]}	AIN				•	1
Total NOCs number		0	3	4	4	11

== Notes ==
=== Name changes notes ===
ANT: Prior to Antigua and Barbuda's independence in 1981, The Associated State of Antigua participated as Antigua in 1976.
BIZ: Belize participated under its former name of British Honduras (HBR) in 1968 and 1972.
BEN: Benin was known as Dahomey (DAH) in 1972.
BUR: Burkina Faso was known as Upper Volta (VOL) in 1972.
TPE: The Chinese Taipei was designated Formosa (RCF) in 1956 and 1960, Taiwan (TWN) in 1964 and 1968, and Republic of China (ROC) in 1972. In 1979, the IOC started to use Chinese Taipei to refer to this NOC, a compromise that was acceptable for the People's Republic of China to start participating in the Olympic Games.
COD: The Democratic Republic of the Congo was known as Zaire (ZAI) between 1984 and 1996.
CIV: Côte d'Ivoire was known as Ivory Coast between 1964 and 1988.
EGY: Egypt participated as the United Arab Republic between 1960 and 1968.
GHA: Prior to Ghana's independence in 1957, Gold Coast participated in the 1952 Games.
GUY: Prior to Guyana's independence in 1966, British Guiana participated from 1948 to 1964.
MYA: Myanmar was known as Burma (BIR) between 1948 and 1988.
MKD: North Macedonia was known as Macedonia, or more formally the Former Yugoslav Republic of Macedonia due to a naming dispute with Greece, between 1996 and 2016.
SAM: Samoa was known as Western Samoa between 1984 and 1996.
SCG: The Federal Republic of Yugoslavia, consisting of the Republic of Serbia and the Republic of Montenegro, participated at the Games since 1996. It was reconstituted as the State Union of Serbia and Montenegro in 2003. At the 1996 and 2000 Games, the nation was still designated Yugoslavia (YUG). The Serbia and Montenegro (SCG) designation and code were used at the 2004 Games.
SRI: Sri Lanka was known as Ceylon (CEY) between 1948 and 1972.
SWZ: Eswatini was known as Swaziland between 1972 and 2016.
TAN: Although Tanganyika and Zanzibar had already merged to form Tanzania in April 1964, the nation was designated Tanganyika in the official report of the 1964 Games.
ZAM: Zambia achieved independence on the last day of the 1964 Games, but had participated as Northern Rhodesia (NRH) during those Games.
ZIM: Prior to Zimbabwe's independence in 1980, Southern Rhodesia participated as Rhodesia (RHO) in 1928, 1960, and 1964.

=== Participation notes ===
1. The Bulgarian Olympic Committee claims that Charles Champaud, a Swiss gymnastics teacher who lived in Sofia, competed for the nation in 1896.
2. Chile claims that one athlete, Luis Subercaseaux Errázuriz, competed for the nation in 1896.
3. Dionysios Kasdaglis, a tennis player in 1896, is listed as Egyptian in some sources. However he was a Greek national who resided in Alexandria. IOC recognizes Kasdaglis as Greek.
4. For athletics at the 1900 Summer Olympics, Adolphe Klingelhoeffer was the son of a Brazilian diplomat. Although he was born and raised in Paris, he had Brazilian citizenship in 1900 and maintained this citizenship until at least the 1940s per French athletics historian Alain Bouille. This wasn't discovered until late 2008 so his participation is usually attributed to France.
5. For tug of war at the 1900 Summer Olympics, Francisco Henríquez de Zubiría who lived in Paris in 1900, had Colombian citizenship but he played with French team of tug of war.
6. Some sources consider Léon Thiércelin and André Corvington, competitors in fencing at the 1900 Games, and Constantin Henriquez in rugby, to be of Haitian nationality.
7. Some sources consider Freydoun Malkom, a fencer who competed at the 1900 Games, of Persian nationality and therefore the first Olympic appearance by Iran.
8. Michel Théato who won gold medal in the marathon at the 1900 Games was born in Luxembourg but lived in Paris. IOC currently attributes his medal to Luxembourg.
9. Victor Lindberg, possibly a water polo player in 1900, was a Fiji-born New Zealander.
10. Some sources consider Carlos de Candamo, a competitor in fencing at the 1900 Games, of Peruvian nationality.
11. ^{a} ^{b} France did not send a team to the 1904 Summer Olympics. However, Albert Corey, a French immigrant to the United States, who won two silver medals in athletics, was of French nationality. The IOC attributes his medal in the marathon to France and the medal in the four mile team race to a mixed team composed of athletes from multiple nations.
12. Norway did not send a team to the 1904 Summer Olympics, however, Charles Ericksen and Bernhoff Hansen took part at Wrestling competitions in welterweight and heavyweight events respectively and won gold medals.
13. ^{a} ^{b} ^{c} ^{d} ^{e} Cambodia, Egypt, the Netherlands, Spain, and Switzerland participated in the equestrian events of the 1956 Games held in Stockholm in June, but did not attend the Games in Melbourne later that year.
14. Syria was part of the United Arab Republic in 1960, but it is unknown if any Syrian athletes participated as part of the UAR team.
15. Singapore was part of the Federation of Malaysia in 1964 before gaining independence in 1965.
16. ^{a} ^{b} ^{c} ^{d} Cameroon, Egypt, Morocco, and Tunisia competed for the first three days of the 1976 Games before withdrawing in support of the boycott by most African nations.
17. ^{a} ^{b} ^{c} ^{d} ^{e} Suriname at the 1960 Games, Libya at the 1964 Games, Liberia at the 1980 Games, Brunei at the 1988 Games, and Djibouti at the 2004 Games took part in the opening ceremony, but no athletes competed, so they are not counted as the participating nations at the IOC Olympic Games web site. Suriname's lone athlete withdrew from 1960 Games due to a scheduling error. Libya marched in the opening ceremony of the 1964 Games, but then withdrew from competition. Liberia's athletes withdrew from 1980 Games after marching in the opening ceremony and took part of the boycott. Brunei's participation in the 1988 Games consisted only of a single official, but no competing athletes. Djibouti marched in the Parade of Nations for the 2004 Games, but no athletes competed.
18. ^{a} Italy did not send a team to the 1904 Olympics. However, Track cyclist Frank Bizzoni, an Italian immigrant to the United States, from New Jersey, was of Italian nationality until 1917.
19. ^{a} The Union of South Africa did not exist yet in 1904, it was created in 1910 from 4 British colonies and the SANOC was only created in 1907. However some extras workers at the Second Boer War exhibition at the St. Louis World's Fair participated in the St. Louis Olympics as a Boer tug of war team, and as two "Zulu" runners in the marathon. In fact the South African runners were Tswanas and former prisoners of war and were also the first ever Black African runners at the Olympics.
20. Australia was not yet a united Commonwealth of Australia but six separate British crown colonies until 1901. Nevertheless, IOC attributes the 1896 and 1900 participation to an Australian nation. Participation of Australia includes also two Games featuring the Australasia team.

== See also ==
- List of participating nations at the Winter Olympic Games
- List of participating nations at the Summer Paralympic Games
- List of IOC country codes
- Lists of National Olympic Committees by continental association:
  - Association of National Olympic Committees of Africa
  - European Olympic Committees
  - Oceania National Olympic Committees
  - Olympic Council of Asia
  - Pan American Sports Organisation
