= Camila Leiria =

Brazilian sitting volleyball player (born 1982)

Personal information
- Full name: Camila Maria Leiria de Castro
- Born: 8 May 1982 (age 44); Rio de Janeiro, Brazil
Medal record
Women's sitting volleyball
Representing Brazil
Paralympic Games
Bronze medal – third place	2016 Rio de Janeiro	Team
Bronze medal – third place	2020 Tokyo	Team
World Championship
Gold medal – first place	2022 Sarajevo	Team

Camila Maria Leiria de Castro (born 8 May 1982 in Rio de Janeiro) is a Brazilian sitting volleyball player. She is a member of the Brazil women's national sitting volleyball team.

She competed at the 2016 Summer Paralympic Games in Rio de Janeiro, winning the bronze medal, and 2020 Summer Paralympics, winning a bronze medal.
