= Luiza Guisso Fiorese =

Brazilian sitting volleyball player (born 1997)

Luíza Fiorese

Personal information
- Full name: Luíza Guisso Fiorese
- Born: 13 July 1997 (age 29); Cachoeiro de Itapemirim, Espírito Santo, Brazil
Medal record
Women's sitting volleyball
Representing Brazil
Paralympic Games
Bronze medal – third place	2020 Tokyo	Team
World Championship
Gold medal – first place	2022 Sarajevo	Team

Luíza Guisso Fiorese (born 13 July 1997) is a Brazilian sitting volleyball player.

== Biography and career ==
At the age of 15, Fiorese suffered from osteosarcoma in her left femur, which led her to undergo surgery to replace part of the bones in her leg with an endoprosthesis. As a result of the medical treatment, she had to stop playing handball. In November 2018, one of the players on the Brazilian sitting volleyball team saw her on a television program and contacted her. At that time, Fiorese had already undergone two surgeries and, in March 2019, she accepted the invitation to try out this new sport.

Fiorese won the bronze medal at the 2020 Summer Paralympics in Tokyo, representing Brazil after defeating the Canadian team 3 sets to 1. In 2022, she was part of the team that won the gold medal at the World Championship, thus guaranteeing a sport at the 2024 Summer Paralympics.

In July 2022, Fiorese participated in the Paraná Sitting Volleyball Championship, held in Curitiba, competing for Círculo Militar do Paraná (CMP), which came in second place. Also on the team was Edwarda Dias, a teammate from the national team that competed in Tokyo.
