= César Rwagasana =

Rwandan swimmer

Sport
- Sport: Swimming
- Strokes: Freestyle
- Classifications: S10

César Rwagasana is a Rwandan competitive swimmer.

He was the first person to represent Rwanda at the Paralympics when he was the country's sole representative at the 2000 Summer Paralympics in Sydney. He had trained in Lake Tanganyika. He competed in the 50m freestyle (S10 category), and swam the length of the pool in 42.39s, finishing last, 13.7s behind the second slowest swimmer. It was his only participation in the Paralympic Games.

Although Kyodo News International incorrectly reported that he had lost his left leg during the Rwandan genocide, he was actually missing his right leg, and Rwagasana told The Daily Telegraph that he had been born without it.
