= Sitting volleyball at the 2020 Summer Paralympics =

Sitting volleyball at the XVI Paralympic Games
- Sitting volleyball pictogram of the 2020 Summer Paralympics
- Venue: Makuhari Messe
- Dates: 27 August – 5 September 2021
- Competitors: 96

Two sitting volleyball team events were held at the 2020 Summer Paralympics, one for men and one for women. They were held at the Makuhari Messe in Tokyo, Japan.

The Tokyo Games were the fifth time the women's sitting volleyball event was contested. It was also the fifth Summer Paralympic Games without standing volleyball events, which had been included from the introduction of volleyball in 1976 through 2000.

The 2020 Summer Olympic and Paralympic Games were postponed until 2021 due to the COVID-19 pandemic. They kept the 2020 name and were held from 24 August to 5 September 2021.

== Qualification ==
There were 16 teams (eight male, eight female) that competed in the competition.

During the 2016 Olympic Games in Rio, the USA women won the event for the first time beating China in the final. Both of these teams qualified again to be joined by six other national teams.

=== Men ===
Means of qualification	Date	Venue	Berths	Qualified
Host Country Allocation	—N/a	—N/a	1	Japan (JPN)
2018 World ParaVolley Championships	15–22 July 2018	(Netherlands) The Hague	2	Iran (IRI); Bosnia and Herzegovina (BIH)
2019 ParaVolley Asia Oceania Zonal Championships	10–15 June 2019	(Thailand) Bangkok	1	China (CHN)
2019 ParaVolley Europe Zonal Championships – Men	15–20 July 2019	(Hungary) Budapest	1	RPC (RPC)
2019 Parapan American Games	23–28 August 2019	(Peru) Lima	1	Brazil (BRA)
2019 ParaVolley Africa Zonal Championships	19–22 September 2019	(Rwanda) Kigali	1	Egypt (EGY)
2020 World ParaVolley Final Paralympic Qualification Event	1–5 June 2021	(Germany) Duisburg	1	Germany (GER)
Total			8	

=== Women ===
Means of qualification	Date	Venue	Berths	Qualified
Host Country Allocation	—N/a	—N/a	1	Japan (JPN)
2018 World ParaVolley Championships	15 – 21 July 2018	(Netherlands) The Hague	2	RPC (RUS); United States (USA)
2019 ParaVolley Asia Oceania Zonal Championships	10–15 June 2019	(Thailand) Bangkok	1	China (CHN)
2019 ParaVolley Europe Zonal Championships – Women	15–20 July 2019	(Hungary) Budapest	1	Italy (ITA)
2019 Parapan American Games	23–28 August 2019	(Peru) Lima	1	Brazil (BRA)
2019 ParaVolley Africa Zonal Championships	15–17 September 2019	(Rwanda) Kigali	1	Rwanda (RWA)
2020 World ParaVolley Final Paralympic Qualification Event	25–29 February 2020	(Canada) Halifax	1	Canada (CAN)
Total			8	

== Medalists ==
Event	Gold	Silver	Bronze
Men's team	Iran; Meysam Alipour; Davoud Alipourian; Mahdi Babadi; Sadegh Bigdeli; Hossein Golestani; Mohammad Hossein Hosseini; Majid Lashkari Sanami; Mehrzad Mehravan; Morteza Mehrzad; Mohammad Nemati; Morteza Ramezani Gerakoei; Ramezan Salehi Hajikolaei	RPC; Aleksandr Baichik; Anatolii Krupin; Andrei Lavrinovich; Viktor Milenin; Vladimir Pankratov; Sergei Pozdeev; Aleksandr Reznichenko; Aleksandr Savichev; Denis Shestakov; Aleksei Volkov; Evgenii Volosnikov; Ilnar Zinnatullin	Bosnia and Herzegovina; Safet Alibašić; Jasmin Brkić; Nizam Čančar; Stevan Crnobrnja; Sabahudin Delalić; Mirzet Duran; Ismet Godinjak; Dževad Hamzić; Ermin Jusufović; Adnan Manko; Asim Medić
Women's team	United States; Whitney Dosty; Heather Erickson; Annie Flood; Kathryn Holloway; Kaleo Kanahele Maclay; Monique Matthews; Nichole Millage; Emma Schieck; Alexis Shifflett; Lora Webster; Jillian Williams; Bethany Zummo	China; Gao Wenwen; Gong Bin; Hu Huizi; Lyu Hongqin; Qiu Junfei; Tang Xuemei; Wang Li; Wang Yanan; Xu Yixiao; Zhang Lijun; Zhang Xufei; Zhao Meiling	Brazil; Gizele Maria Dias; Nurya Silva; Nathalie Silva; Edwarda Dias; Ana Luísa Aparecida; Jani Freitas; Luiza Guisso Fiorese; Adria Silva; Camila Leiria; Bruna Nascimento Lima; Pâmela Pereira; Laiana Rodrigues

== See also ==
- Volleyball at the 2020 Summer Olympics
