= Rwanda at the 2008 Summer Paralympics =

- IPC code: RWA
- NPC: National Paralympic Committee of Rwanda

in Beijing
- Competitors: 1 in 1 sport
- Flag bearers: Jean de Dieu Nkundabera (opening & closing)
- Medals Ranked -th: Gold 0 Silver 0 Bronze 0 Total 0

Summer Paralympics appearances (overview)
- 2000; 2004; 2008; 2012; 2016; 2020; 2024

Rwanda sent a delegation to compete at the 2008 Summer Paralympics in Beijing. The country was represented by a single athlete. Jean de Dieu Nkundabera, who won a bronze medal in the 2004 Summer Paralympics in Athens, competed in the 800 metre wheelchair sprint.

== Athletics ==
Men

Athlete	Class	Event	Heats		Semifinal		Final		
Athlete	Class	Event	Result	Rank	Result	Rank	Result	Points	Rank
Jean de Dieu Nkundabera	T46	800 m	2:02.12	5	did not advance				

== See also ==
- 2008 Summer Paralympics
- Rwanda at the Paralympics
- Rwanda at the 2008 Summer Olympics
