= Rwanda at the 2024 Summer Paralympics =

- IPC code: RWA
- NPC: National Paralympic Committee of Rwanda

in Paris, France August 28, 2024 – September 8, 2024
- Competitors: 12 in 2 sports
- Flag bearers: Liliane Mukobwankawe; Emmanuel Niyibizi
- Medals: Gold 0 Silver 0 Bronze 0 Total 0

Summer Paralympics appearances (overview)
- 2000; 2004; 2008; 2012; 2016; 2020; 2024

Rwanda competed at the 2024 Summer Paralympics in Paris, France, from 28 August to 8 September 2024. It was the nation's seventh consecutive appearance at the Summer Paralympics, since the nation's debut at 2000.

== Competitors ==
The following is the list of number of competitors in the Games.

| Sport | Men | Women | Total |
|---|---|---|---|
| Sitting volleyball | 0 | 11 | 11 |
| Athletics | 1 | 0 | 1 |
| Total | 0 | 11 | 11 |

== Athletics ==
Emmanual Niyibizi qualified after winning Gold at the Dubai 2024 World Para Athletics Grand Prix on 15 February 2024.

Men

| Athlete | Event | Heat | | Final | |
| Athlete | Event | Result | Rank | Result | Rank |
|---|---|---|---|---|---|
| Emmanuel Niyibizi | 1500m T46 | — | | DQ | |

== Sitting volleyball ==
Rwanda women's national team entered the paralympic games by virtue of their gold medal results, at the 2024 African Sitting Volleyball Championships in Lagos, Nigeria.

Roster

- Marie adeline Mucyo
- Liliane Mukobwankawe
- Hosiana Musila
- Claudine Murebwayire
- Alice Musabyemariya
- Chantal Mutuyimana
- Sandrine Nyirambarushimana
- Solange Nyiraneza
- Agnes Nyiranshimiyimana
- Clementine Umutoni
- Faustina Uwimpuhwe

Summary

| Team | Event | Group Stage | | | | Semifinal | Classification 7-8 | |
| Team | Event | Opposition Score | Opposition Score | Opposition Score | Rank | Opposition Score | Opposition Score | Rank |
|---|---|---|---|---|---|---|---|---|
| Rwanda women's | Women's tournament | Brazil; L 0–3 | Slovenia; L 1–3 | Canada; L 0–3 | 4 | — | France; W 3–0 | 7 |

== Athlete disappearance ==
On 27 August 2024, Claudine Bazubagira from the sitting volleyball team was reported missing by the Rwandan Olympic Committee, after they had not been seen since leaving the team camp in Courbevoie on 20 August.

== See also ==
- Rwanda at the 2024 Summer Olympics
- Rwanda at the Paralympics
