= Rwanda at the 2012 Summer Paralympics =

- IPC code: RWA
- NPC: National Paralympic Committee of Rwanda

in London
- Competitors: 14 in 3 sports
- Medals: Gold 0 Silver 0 Bronze 0 Total 0

Summer Paralympics appearances (overview)
- 2000; 2004; 2008; 2012; 2016; 2020; 2024

Rwanda competed at the 2012 Summer Paralympics in London, United Kingdom, from 29 August to 9 September 2012.

== Team ==
Dominique Bizimana served as the President of the National Paralympic Committee of Rwanda in 2012, along with being a member of the men's national sitting volleyball team. The delegation stayed at Cavesson House in the Paralympic Village.

== Athletics ==
Men's track and road events

Athlete	Event	Heat		Final	
Athlete	Event	Result	Rank	Result	Rank
Hermas Muvunyi	400 m T46	49.75	1 Q	49.59 AF	5
Hermas Muvunyi	800 m T46	1:58.18	2 Q	DSQ	
Theoneste Nsengimana	1500 m T46	4:08.83	8	did not advance	

== Powerlifting ==
Men

Athlete	Event	Result	Rank
Theogene Hakizimana	82.5 kg	175	10

== Volleyball ==
=== Men's tournament ===
The team was the first from Sub-Saharan Africa to participate at the Paralympic Games. Many members of the team went to London having survived or having had family who survived the Rwandan genocide. Two member of the national squad lost limbs fighting against those who committed the 1992 genocide. One of those team members who lost a leg was Dominique Bizimana.

Roster

The following is the Rwandan roster in the men's volleyball tournament of the 2012 Summer Paralympics.

№	Name	Date of birth	Position	2012 club
1	Dominique Bizimana	20 July 1976		(Rwanda) Intwari Handisport Club
2	James Rutikanga	13 December 1990		(Rwanda) Intwari Handisport Club
3	Vincent Tuyisenge	8 April 1983		(Rwanda) THT Nyarugenge
4	Jean Rukundo	1 January 1964		(Rwanda) HVP Gatagara
6	Jean Baptiste Murema	2 June 1982		(Rwanda) Intwari Handisport Club
7	Callixte Twagirayezu	28 August 1975		(Rwanda) Intwari Handisport Club
8	Jean Bosco Ngizwenimana	1 January 1983		(Rwanda) Intwari Handisport Club
9	Jean Baptiste Gahamanyi	20 October 1987		(Rwanda) HVP Gatagara
10	Fulgence Hagenimana	5 May 1990		(Rwanda) HVP Gatagara
11	Eric Ngirinshuti	1 September 1988		(Rwanda) THT Nyarugenge
15	Emile Vuningabo	9 October 1986		(Rwanda) Intwari Handisport Club

Group play

Pos	Team	Pld	W	L	Pts	SW	SL	SR	SPW	SPL	SPR
1	Iran	4	4	0	8	12	1	12.000	322	207	1.556
2	Bosnia and Herzegovina	4	3	1	7	10	3	3.333	309	240	1.288
3	Brazil	4	2	2	6	6	6	1.000	257	230	1.117
4	China	4	1	3	5	3	9	0.333	243	266	0.914
5	Rwanda	4	0	4	4	0	12	0.000	115	300	0.383

30 August 2012; 21:00	Iran	3–0	Rwanda	ExCeL London, London; Referees: Janko Plešnik (SLO), Dee Wauchope (GBR)
30 August 2012; 21:00	(25–11, 25–6, 25–8); Report			ExCeL London, London; Referees: Janko Plešnik (SLO), Dee Wauchope (GBR)

31 August 2012; 14:00	Brazil	3–0	Rwanda	ExCeL London, London; Referees: Stephen Giugni (AUS), Glynn Archibald (GBR)
31 August 2012; 14:00	(25–5, 25–5, 25–13); Report			ExCeL London, London; Referees: Stephen Giugni (AUS), Glynn Archibald (GBR)

2 September 2012; 9:00	China	3–0	Rwanda	ExCeL London, London; Referees: Dee Wauchope (GBR), Ute Fischer (GER)
2 September 2012; 9:00	(25–10, 25–13, 25–17); Report			ExCeL London, London; Referees: Dee Wauchope (GBR), Ute Fischer (GER)

3 September 2012; 21:00	Bosnia and Herzegovina	3–0	Rwanda	ExCeL London, London; Referees: Benno Meijer (NED), Glynn Archibald (GBR)
3 September 2012; 21:00	(25–7, 25–12, 25–8); Report			ExCeL London, London; Referees: Benno Meijer (NED), Glynn Archibald (GBR)

9th/10th place classification

7 September 2012; 14:00	Morocco	1–3	Rwanda	ExCeL London, London; Referees: Dee Wauchope (GBR)
7 September 2012; 14:00	(25–20, 25–27, 22–25, 23–25); Report			ExCeL London, London; Referees: Dee Wauchope (GBR)

== See also ==
- Rwanda at the 2012 Summer Olympics
