= List of participating nations at the Summer Paralympic Games =

This is a list of nations, as represented by National Paralympic Committees (NPCs), that have participated in the Summer Paralympic Games between 1960 and 2024. As of the 2024 Games,188 NPCS Paralympic Games.At least 188 National Paralympic Committees have sent delegations to an edition of the Paralympic Games. The fact that the Faroe Islands, Gilbraltar and Macau, China do not have National Olympic Committees recognized by IOC, has already sent athletes to the Paralympic Games officially.It is also noted that nine countries were present in all editions of the Summer Paralympic Games: Argentina, Australia, Austria, France, Great Britain, Italy, Sweden, Switzerland and United States.

== List of nations ==
=== Table legend ===
60	In the table headings, indicates the Games year
•	Participated in the specified Games
H	Host nation for the specified Games
	NPC superseded or preceded by other NPC(s) during these years

=== Alphabetical list ===
A	Code	60	64	68	72	76	80	84	88	92	96	00	04	08	12	16	20	24
Afghanistan	AFG										•		•	•	•	•	•	•
Albania	ALB														•			
Algeria	ALG									•	•	•	•	•	•	•	•	•
Andorra	AND														•			
Angola	ANG										•	•	•	•	•	•	•	•
Antigua and Barbuda	ANT														•			
Argentina	ARG	•	•	•	•	•	•	•	•	•	•	•	•	•	•	•	•	•
Armenia	ARM	Soviet Union								^{EUN}	•	•	•	•	•	•	•	•
Aruba	ARU									•						•	•	•
Australia	AUS	•	•	•	•	•	•	•	•	•	•	H	•	•	•	•	•	•
Austria	AUT	•	•	•	•	•	•	•	•	•	•	•	•	•	•	•	•	•
Azerbaijan	AZE	Soviet Union								^{EUN}	•	•	•	•	•	•	•	•
B	Code	60	64	68	72	76	80	84	88	92	96	00	04	08	12	16	20	24
Bahamas	BAH				•	•	•	•	•									
Bahrain	BRN							•	•	•	•	•	•	•	•	•	•	•
Bangladesh	BAN												•	•				•
Barbados	BAR											•	•	•	•		•	•
Belarus	BLR	Soviet Union								^{EUN}	•	•	•	•	•	•	•	^{NPA}
Belgium	BEL	•	•	•	•	•	•	•	•	•	•	•	•	•	•	•	•	•
Benin	BEN											•	•	•	•	•	•	•
Bermuda	BER										•	•	•	•	•	•	•	•
Bhutan	BHU																•	•
Bosnia and Herzegovina	BIH	Yugoslavia									•	•	•	•	•	•	•	•
Bolivia	BOL									•								
Botswana	BOT												•	•		•	•	•
Brazil	BRA				•	•	•	•	•	•	•	•	•	•	•	H	•	•
Brunei	BRU														•			
Bulgaria	BUL								•	•	•	•	•	•	•	•	•	•
Burkina Faso	BUR									•	•	•		•	•	•	•	•
Burundi	BDI													•	•	•	•	•
C	Code	60	64	68	72	76	80	84	88	92	96	00	04	08	12	16	20	24
Cambodia	CAM											•	•	•	•	•	•	•
Cameroon	CMR														•	•	•	•
Canada	CAN			•	•	H	•	•	•	•	•	•	•	•	•	•	•	•
Cape Verde	CPV												•	•	•	•	•	•
Central African Republic	CAF												•	•	•	•	•	•
Chile	CHI									•	•	•	•	•	•	•	•	•
China	CHN							•	•	•	•	•	•	H	•	•	•	•
Chinese Taipei	TPE									•	•	•	•	•	•	•	•	•
Colombia	COL					•	•		•	•	•	•	•	•	•	•	•	•
Comoros	COM														•	•		
Republic of the Congo	CGO															•	•	•
Democratic Republic of the Congo	COD														•	•	•	•
Costa Rica	CRC									•	•	•	•	•	•	•	•	•
Curaçao	CUW									•								
Croatia	CRO	Yugoslavia								•	•	•	•	•	•	•	•	•
Cuba	CUB									•	•	•	•	•	•	•	•	•
Cyprus	CYP								•	•	•	•	•	•	•	•	•	•
Czech Republic	CZE	Czechoslovakia									•	•	•	•	•	•	•	•
Czechoslovakia	TCH				•		•		•	•								
D	Code	60	64	68	72	76	80	84	88	92	96	00	04	08	12	16	20	24
Denmark	DEN			•	•	•	•	•	•	•	•	•	•	•	•	•	•	•
Djibouti	DJI														•			
Dominican Republic	DOM									•	•		•	•	•	•	•	•
E	Code	60	64	68	72	76	80	84	88	92	96	00	04	08	12	16	20	24
Ecuador	ECU					•		•		•	•	•	•	•	•	•	•	•
Egypt	EGY				•	•	•	•	•	•	•	•	•	•	•	•	•	•
El Salvador	ESA									•		•	•	•	•	•	•	•
Eritrea	ERI																	•
Estonia	EST	Soviet Union								•	•	•	•	•	•	•	•	•
Ethiopia	ETH			•		•	•						•	•	•	•	•	•
F	Code	60	64	68	72	76	80	84	88	92	96	00	04	08	12	16	20	24
Faroe Islands	FRO							•	•	•	•	•	•	•	•	•	•	
Fiji	FIJ		•			•				•	•	•	•	•	•	•	•	•
Finland	FIN	•		•	•	•	•	•	•	•	•	•	•	•	•	•	•	•
France	FRA	•	•	•	•	•	•	•	•	•	•	•	•	•	•	•	•	H
G	Code	60	64	68	72	76	80	84	88	92	96	00	04	08	12	16	20	24
Gabon	GAB													•	•	•	•	•
The Gambia	GAM														•	•	•	•
Georgia	GEO	Soviet Union								^{EUN}				•	•	•	•	•
Germany	GER	East Germany, West Germany								•	•	•	•	•	•	•	•	•
East Germany	GDR							•										
West Germany	FRG	•	•	•	H	•	•	•	•									
Gibraltar	GIB				•													
Ghana	GHA									•			•	•	•	•	•	•
Great Britain	GBR	•	•	•	•	•	•	H	•	•	•	•	•	•	H	•	•	•
Greece	GRE					•	•	•	•	•	•	•	H	•	•	•	•	•
Grenada	GRN																•	•
Guatemala	GUA					•		•	•	•			•	•	•	•	•	•
Guinea	GUI												•	•		•	•	•
Guinea-Bissau	GBS														•	•	•	•
Guyana	GUY																•	
H	Code	60	64	68	72	76	80	84	88	92	96	00	04	08	12	16	20	24
Haiti	HAI													•	•	•	•	•
Honduras	HON									•	•	•	•	•	•	•	•	•
Hong Kong	HKG				•	•	•	•	•	•	•	•	•	•	•	•	•	•
Hungary	HUN				•			•	•	•	•	•	•	•	•	•	•	•
I	Code	60	64	68	72	76	80	84	88	92	96	00	04	08	12	16	20	24
Iceland	ISL						•	•	•	•	•	•	•	•	•	•	•	•
India	IND			•	•			•	•	•	•	•	•	•	•	•	•	•
Indonesia	INA					•	•	•	•		•	•	•	•	•	•	•	•
Iran	IRI								•	•	•	•	•	•	•	•	•	•
Iraq	IRQ									•		•	•	•	•	•	•	•
Ireland	IRL	•	•	•	•	•	•	•	•	•	•	•	•	•	•	•	•	•
Israel	ISR	•	•	H	•	•	•	•	•	•	•	•	•	•	•	•	•	•
Italy	ITA	H	•	•	•	•	•	•	•	•	•	•	•	•	•	•	•	•
Ivory Coast	CIV									•	•	•	•	•	•	•	•	•
J	Code	60	64	68	72	76	80	84	88	92	96	00	04	08	12	16	20	24
Jamaica	JAM			•	•		•	•	•	•	•	•	•	•	•	•	•	•
Japan	JPN		H	•	•	•	•	•	•	•	•	•	•	•	•	•	H	•
Jordan	JOR							•	•	•	•	•	•	•	•	•	•	•
K	Code	60	64	68	72	76	80	84	88	92	96	00	04	08	12	16	20	24
Kazakhstan	KAZ	Soviet Union								^{EUN}	•	•	•	•	•	•	•	•
Kenya	KEN				•		•	•	•	•	•	•	•	•	•	•	•	•
Kiribati	KIR																	•
North Korea	PRK														•	•		
South Korea	KOR			•	•	•	•	•	H	•	•	•	•	•	•	•	•	•
Kosovo	KOS	Yugoslavia											^{SCG}					•
Kuwait	KUW						•	•	•	•	•	•	•	•	•	•	•	•
Kyrgyzstan	KGZ	Soviet Union								^{EUN}	•	•	•	•	•	•	•	•
L	Code	60	64	68	72	76	80	84	88	92	96	00	04	08	12	16	20	24
Laos	LAO											•		•	•	•	•	•
Latvia	LAT	Soviet Union								•	•	•	•	•	•	•	•	•
Lebanon	LIB									•		•		•	•		•	•
Lesotho	LES											•	•	•	•	•	•	•
Liberia	LBR														•	•	•	•
Libya	LBA										•	•	•	•	•	•	•	•
Liechtenstein	LIE							•	•	•			•					
Lithuania	LTU	Soviet Union								•	•	•	•	•	•	•	•	•
Luxembourg	LUX					•	•	•		•	•			•			•	•
M	Code	60	64	68	72	76	80	84	88	92	96	00	04	08	12	16	20	24
Macau	MAC								•	•	•	•	•	•	•	•		•
Madagascar	MAD											•		•	•	•	•	
Malawi	MAW														•	•	•	•
Malaysia	MAS				•				•	•	•	•	•	•	•	•	•	•
Maldives	MDV																•	•
Mali	MLI											•		•	•	•	•	•
Malta	MLT	•	•	•	•		•	•		•				•	•	•	•	•
Mauritania	MTN											•	•		•			
Mauritius	MRI										•		•	•	•	•	•	•
Mexico	MEX				•	•	•	•	•	•	•	•	•	•	•	•	•	•
Moldova	MDA	Soviet Union								^{EUN}	•	•	•	•	•	•	•	•
Mongolia	MGL											•	•	•	•	•	•	•
Montenegro	MNE	Yugoslavia											^{SCG}	•	•	•	•	•
Morocco	MAR								•	•	•	•	•	•	•	•	•	•
Mozambique	MOZ														•	•	•	•
Myanmar	MYA					•		•		•				•	•	•		•
N	Code	60	64	68	72	76	80	84	88	92	96	00	04	08	12	16	20	24
Namibia	NAM									•			•	•	•	•	•	•
Nepal	NEP												•	•	•	•	•	•
Netherlands	NED	•	•	•	•	•	H	•	•	•	•	•	•	•	•	•	•	•
New Zealand	NZL			•	•	•	•	•	•	•	•	•	•	•	•	•	•	•
Nicaragua	NCA									•			•		•	•	•	•
Niger	NIG												•	•	•	•	•	•
Nigeria	NGR									•	•	•	•	•	•	•	•	•
North Macedonia	MKD	Yugoslavia								^{IOP}	•	•	•	•	•	•	•	•
Norway	NOR	•		•	•	•	•	•	•	•	•	•	•	•	•	•	•	•
O	Code	60	64	68	72	76	80	84	88	92	96	00	04	08	12	16	20	24
Oman	OMA								•	•	•	•	•	•	•	•	•	•
P	Code	60	64	68	72	76	80	84	88	92	96	00	04	08	12	16	20	24
Pakistan	PAK									•	•	•	•	•	•	•	•	•
Palestine	PLE											•	•	•	•	•	•	•
Panama	PAN									•	•	•	•	•	•	•	•	•
Papua New Guinea	PNG							•				•		•	•	•	•	•
Paraguay	PAR									•							•	•
Peru	PER				•	•					•	•	•	•	•	•	•	•
Philippines	PHI								•	•	•	•	•	•	•	•	•	•
Poland	POL				•	•	•	•	•	•	•	•	•	•	•	•	•	•
Portugal	POR				•			•	•	•	•	•	•	•	•	•	•	•
Puerto Rico	PUR								•	•	•	•	•	•	•	•	•	•
Q	Code	60	64	68	72	76	80	84	88	92	96	00	04	08	12	16	20	24
Qatar	QAT										•	•	•	•	•	•	•	•
R	Code	60	64	68	72	76	80	84	88	92	96	00	04	08	12	16	20	24
Romania	ROU				•					•	•	•	•	•	•	•	•	•
Russia	RUS								^{URS}	^{EUN}	•	•	•	•	•		^{RPC}	^{NPA}
Soviet Union	URS								•									
Unified Team	EUN									•								
RPC	RPC																•	
Neutral Paralympic Athletes	NPA																	•
Rwanda	RWA											•	•	•	•	•	•	•
S	Code	60	64	68	72	76	80	84	88	92	96	00	04	08	12	16	20	24
Saint Vincent and the Grenadines	VIN																•	•
Samoa	SAM											•	•	•	•	•		
San Marino	SMR														•			
São Tomé and Príncipe	STP															•	•	•
Saudi Arabia	KSA									•	•	•	•	•	•	•	•	•
Senegal	SEN												•	•	•	•	•	•
Serbia	SRB	Yugoslavia											^{SCG}	•	•	•	•	•
Serbia and Montenegro	SCG	Yugoslavia												•				
Independent Paralympic Participants	IPP	•																
Yugoslavia	YUG	•			•		•	•	•	^{IPP}	•	•						
Seychelles	SEY									•						•		
Sierra Leone	SLE									•	•				•	•	•	•
Singapore	SIN								•	•	•	•	•	•	•	•	•	•
Slovakia	SVK	Czechoslovakia									•	•	•	•	•	•	•	•
Slovenia	SLO	Yugoslavia								•	•	•	•	•	•	•	•	•
Solomon Islands	SOL														•		•	•
Somalia	SOM															•	•	•
South Africa	RSA		•	•	•	•				•	•	•	•	•	•	•	•	•
Spain	ESP			•	•	•	•	•	•	H	•	•	•	•	•	•	•	•
Sri Lanka	SRI									•	•	•	•	•	•	•	•	•
Sudan	SUD						•						•					
Suriname	SUR									•			•	•	•	•		•
Sweden	SWE	•	•	•	•	•	•	•	•	•	•	•	•	•	•	•	•	•
Switzerland	SUI	•	•	•	•	•	•	•	•	•	•	•	•	•	•	•	•	•
Syria	SYR									•	•	•	•	•	•	•	•	•
T	Code	60	64	68	72	76	80	84	88	92	96	00	04	08	12	16	20	24
Tajikistan	TJK	Soviet Union								^{EUN}			•	•	•	•	•	
Tanzania	TAN									•			•	•	•	•	•	•
Thailand	THA							•	•	•	•	•	•	•	•	•	•	•
Timor-Leste	TLS											[^]		•	•	•		•
Togo	TOG															•	•	•
Tonga	TGA											•	•	•	•	•		•
Trinidad and Tobago	TRI							•	•						•	•		•
Tunisia	TUN								•	•	•	•	•	•	•	•	•	•
Turkey	TUR									•		•	•	•	•	•	•	•
Turkmenistan	TKM	Soviet Union								^{EUN}		•	•	•	•	•		•
U	Code	60	64	68	72	76	80	84	88	92	96	00	04	08	12	16	20	24
Uganda	UGA				•	•					•	•	•	•	•	•	•	•
Ukraine	UKR	Soviet Union								^{EUN}	•	•	•	•	•	•	•	•
United Arab Emirates	UAE									•	•	•	•	•	•	•	•	•
United States	USA	•	•	•	•	•	•	H	•	•	•	•	•	•	•	•	•	•
Uruguay	URU									•	•	•	•	•	•	•	•	•
Uzbekistan	UZB	Soviet Union								^{EUN}			•	•	•	•	•	•
V	Code	60	64	68	72	76	80	84	88	92	96	00	04	08	12	16	20	24
Vanuatu	VAN											•		•	•			•
Venezuela	VEN							•		•	•	•	•	•	•	•	•	•
Vietnam	VIE											•	•	•	•	•	•	•
Virgin Islands	ISV														•	•	•	•
Y	Code	60	64	68	72	76	80	84	88	92	96	00	04	08	12	16	20	24
Yemen	YEM									•							•	•
Z	Code	60	64	68	72	76	80	84	88	92	96	00	04	08	12	16	20	24
Zambia	ZAM										•	•		•	•		•	•
Zimbabwe	ZIM	Rhodesia					•	•		•	•	•	•	•	•	•	•	•
Rhodesia	RHO	•	•	•	•													
Other entries	Code	60	64	68	72	76	80	84	88	92	96	00	04	08	12	16	20	24
Individual Paralympic Athletes	IPA											[^]						
Independent Paralympic Athletes	API															[^]		
Refugee Paralympic Team	RPT																[^]	[^]
Total		18	19	28	43	40	43	54	60	103	104	121	135	146	164	159	162	169
