= Adria Silva =

Brazilian sitting volleyball player (born 1983)

Adria Jesus da Silva
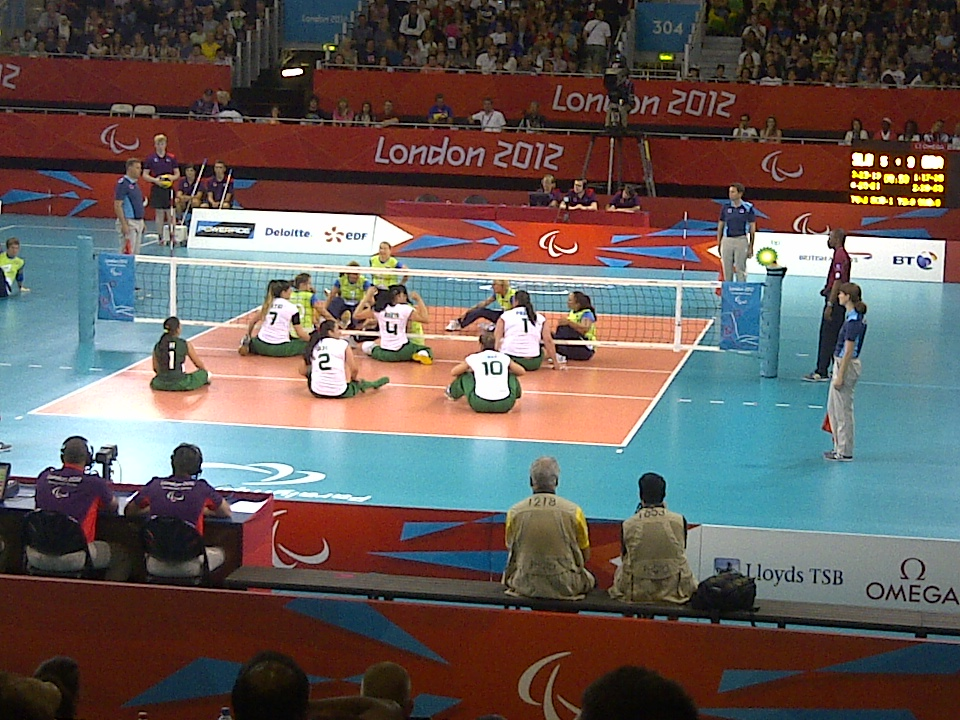
- Silva (#4) at the 2012 Summer Paralympics

Personal information
- Nationality: Brazilian
- Born: 1 June 1983 (age 43)

Volleyball information
- Number: 4

Career
| Years | Teams |
|---|---|
| 2012 | (Brazil) Adap |

National team
| 2012 | Brazil sitting volleyball team |
Honours
Representing Brazil
Paralympic Games
| Bronze medal – third place | 2016 Rio | Team |
| Bronze medal – third place | 2020 tokyo | Team |
World Championship
| Gold medal – first place | 2022 Sarajevo | Team |
| Silver medal – second place | 2026 Hangzhou | Team |

Adria Jesus da Silva (born 1 June 1983) is a Brazilian Paralympic sitting volleyball player. She is part of the Brazil women's national sitting volleyball team.

She competed at the 2012 Summer Paralympics, finishing 5th, and the 2016 Summer Paralympics.

== See also ==
- Brazil at the 2012 Summer Paralympics
- Brazil at the 2016 Summer Paralympics
- Brazil at the 2020 Summer Paralympics
