= Sitting volleyball at the 2020 Summer Paralympics – Women's tournament =

Women's sitting volleyball at the XVI Paralympic Games
- Venue: Makuhari Messe
- Dates: 27 August – 5 September 2021
- Competitors: 96 from 8 nations

Medalists
1st place, gold medalist(s)		United States (2nd title)
2nd place, silver medalist(s)		China
3rd place, bronze medalist(s)		Brazil

The women's tournament in sitting volleyball at the 2020 Summer Paralympics was held from 27 August to 5 September 2021 at the Makuhari Messe, Tokyo.

== Results ==
All times are local (UTC+9).

=== Preliminary round ===
==== Pool A ====
Pos	Team	Pld	W	L	Pts	SW	SL	SR	SPW	SPL	SPR	Qualification
1	Brazil	3	3	0	3	9	3	3.000	289	237	1.219	Semifinals
2	Canada	3	2	1	2	8	4	2.000	278	243	1.144	Semifinals
3	Italy	3	1	2	1	5	6	0.833	227	232	0.978	Fifth place match
4	Japan (H)	3	0	3	0	0	9	0.000	143	225	0.636	Seventh place match

Source: TOCOG
(H) Host

27 August 2021; 10:00 v	Japan	0–3	Italy	Makuhari Messe, Tokyo; Referees: Toomas Murulo (EST), Ute Fischer (GER)
27 August 2021; 10:00 v	(23–25, 11–25, 10–25); Results Statistics			Makuhari Messe, Tokyo; Referees: Toomas Murulo (EST), Ute Fischer (GER)

27 August 2021; 18:30 v	Brazil	3–2	Canada	Makuhari Messe, Tokyo; Referees: Krisztina Árpás (HUN), Kim Jong-heun (KOR)
27 August 2021; 18:30 v	(21–25, 26–24, 25–20, 27–29, 17–15); Results Statistics			Makuhari Messe, Tokyo; Referees: Krisztina Árpás (HUN), Kim Jong-heun (KOR)

29 August 2021; 14:00 v	Italy	1–3	Canada	Makuhari Messe, Tokyo; Referees: Ute Fischer (GER), Andre Calado (BRA)
29 August 2021; 14:00 v	(16–25, 14–25, 25–15, 18–25); Results Statistics			Makuhari Messe, Tokyo; Referees: Ute Fischer (GER), Andre Calado (BRA)

29 August 2021; 20:30 v	Japan	0–3	Brazil	Makuhari Messe, Tokyo; Referees: Christina Fiebich (GER), Haris Helac (BIH)
29 August 2021; 20:30 v	(13–25, 16–25, 16–25); Results Statistics			Makuhari Messe, Tokyo; Referees: Christina Fiebich (GER), Haris Helac (BIH)

1 September 2021; 10:00 v	Brazil	3–1	Italy	Makuhari Messe, Tokyo; Referees: Benno Meijer (NED), Krisztina Árpás (HUN)
1 September 2021; 10:00 v	(23–25, 25–17, 25–16, 25–21); Results Statistics			Makuhari Messe, Tokyo; Referees: Benno Meijer (NED), Krisztina Árpás (HUN)

1 September 2021; 20:30 v	Canada	3–0	Japan	Makuhari Messe, Tokyo; Referees: Huang Xiao (CHN), Sari Mannersuo (FIN)
1 September 2021; 20:30 v	(25–19, 25–15, 25–20); Results Statistics			Makuhari Messe, Tokyo; Referees: Huang Xiao (CHN), Sari Mannersuo (FIN)

==== Pool B ====
Pos	Team	Pld	W	L	Pts	SW	SL	SR	SPW	SPL	SPR	Qualification
1	China	3	3	0	3	9	0	MAX	226	137	1.650	Semifinals
2	United States	3	2	1	2	6	3	2.000	213	163	1.307	Semifinals
3	RPC	3	1	2	1	3	6	0.500	181	180	1.006	Fifth place match
4	Rwanda	3	0	3	0	0	9	0.000	85	225	0.378	Seventh place match

Source: TOCOG

28 August 2021; 14:00 v	United States	3–0	Rwanda	Makuhari Messe, Tokyo; Referees: Barbara Pakuła (POL), Dominik Raca (CRO)
28 August 2021; 14:00 v	(25–11, 25–9, 25–11); Results Statistics			Makuhari Messe, Tokyo; Referees: Barbara Pakuła (POL), Dominik Raca (CRO)

28 August 2021; 20:30 v	China	3–0	RPC	Makuhari Messe, Tokyo; Referees: Benno Meijer (NED), Marie-Claude Richer (CAN)
28 August 2021; 20:30 v	(25–20, 25–16, 25–14); Results Statistics			Makuhari Messe, Tokyo; Referees: Benno Meijer (NED), Marie-Claude Richer (CAN)

30 August 2021; 10:00 v	Rwanda	0–3	RPC	Makuhari Messe, Tokyo; Referees: Barbara Pakuła (POL), Huang Xiao (CHN)
30 August 2021; 10:00 v	(9–25, 9–25, 12–25); Results Statistics			Makuhari Messe, Tokyo; Referees: Barbara Pakuła (POL), Huang Xiao (CHN)

30 August 2021; 18:30 v	United States	0–3	China	Makuhari Messe, Tokyo; Referees: Benno Meijer (NED), Haris Helac (BIH)
30 August 2021; 18:30 v	(17–25, 22–25, 24–26); Results Statistics			Makuhari Messe, Tokyo; Referees: Benno Meijer (NED), Haris Helac (BIH)

1 September 2021; 14:00 v	China	3–0	Rwanda	Makuhari Messe, Tokyo; Referees: Andre Calado (BRA), Ritsuto Yamamichi (JPN)
1 September 2021; 14:00 v	(25–6, 25–10, 25–8); Results Statistics			Makuhari Messe, Tokyo; Referees: Andre Calado (BRA), Ritsuto Yamamichi (JPN)

1 September 2021; 18:30 v	RPC	0–3	United States	Makuhari Messe, Tokyo; Referees: Neal Konowalyk (CAN), Vanessa Redes (BRA)
1 September 2021; 18:30 v	(19–25, 15–25, 22–25); Results Statistics			Makuhari Messe, Tokyo; Referees: Neal Konowalyk (CAN), Vanessa Redes (BRA)

=== Knockout stage ===
==== Bracket ====
Semifinals
3 September
Brazil	0
United States	3
3 September
China	3
Canada	0

Gold medal match
5 September
United States (gold)	3
China (silver)	1
Bronze medal match
4 September
Brazil (bronze)	3
Canada	1

==== Seventh place match ====
3 September 2021; 13:30 v	Japan	0–3	Rwanda	Makuhari Messe, Tokyo; Referees: Sari Mannersuo (FIN), Barbara Pakuła (POL)
3 September 2021; 13:30 v	(19–25, 21–25, 22–25); Results Statistics			Makuhari Messe, Tokyo; Referees: Sari Mannersuo (FIN), Barbara Pakuła (POL)

==== Fifth place match ====
3 September 2021; 15:30 v	Italy	1–3	RPC	Makuhari Messe, Tokyo; Referees: Dominik Raca (CRO), Khalid Shanishah (LBA)
3 September 2021; 15:30 v	(25–22, 23–25, 23–25, 14–25); Results Statistics			Makuhari Messe, Tokyo; Referees: Dominik Raca (CRO), Khalid Shanishah (LBA)

==== Semifinals ====
3 September 2021; 18:30 v	Brazil	0–3	United States	Makuhari Messe, Tokyo; Referees: Krisztina Árpás (HUN), Huang Xiao (CHN)
3 September 2021; 18:30 v	(19–25, 11–25, 23–25); Results Statistics			Makuhari Messe, Tokyo; Referees: Krisztina Árpás (HUN), Huang Xiao (CHN)

3 September 2021; 20:30 v	China	3–0	Canada	Makuhari Messe, Tokyo; Referees: Vanessa Redes (BRA), Ritsuto Yamamichi (JPN)
3 September 2021; 20:30 v	(25–18, 25–20, 25–15); Results Statistics			Makuhari Messe, Tokyo; Referees: Vanessa Redes (BRA), Ritsuto Yamamichi (JPN)

==== Bronze medal match ====
4 September 2021; 16:30 v	(bronze) Brazil	3–1	Canada	Makuhari Messe, Tokyo; Referees: Khalid Shanishah (LBA), Ute Fischer (GER)
4 September 2021; 16:30 v	(25–15, 24–26, 26–24, 25–14); Results Statistics			Makuhari Messe, Tokyo; Referees: Khalid Shanishah (LBA), Ute Fischer (GER)

==== Gold medal match ====
5 September 2021; 10:00 v	(gold) United States	3–1	China (silver)	Makuhari Messe, Tokyo; Referees: Ebrahim Firouzi (IRI), Marie-Claude Richer (CAN)
5 September 2021; 10:00 v	(25–12, 25–20, 22–25, 25–19); Results Statistics			Makuhari Messe, Tokyo; Referees: Ebrahim Firouzi (IRI), Marie-Claude Richer (CAN)

== Final ranking ==
Rank	Team
1st place, gold medalist(s)	United States
2nd place, silver medalist(s)	China
3rd place, bronze medalist(s)	Brazil
4	Canada
5	RPC
6	Italy
7	Rwanda
8	Japan

2016 Women's Paralympic champions

United States
2nd title

12-woman roster
Lora Webster, Bethany Zummo (L), Alexis Shifflett, Kathryn Holloway (c), Heather Erickson, Monique Matthews, Whitney Dosty, Jillian Williams, Emma Schieck, Nichole Millage, Kaleo Maclay, Annie Flood
Head coach
Bill Hamiter

== See also ==
- Sitting volleyball at the 2020 Summer Paralympics – Men's tournament
