= Annie Flood =

American Paralympic volleyballer (born 2003)

Personal information
- Born: May 16, 2003 (age 23) Salem, Oregon, U.S.
- Education: Linfield University
- Height: 5 ft 7 in (170 cm)
Medal record
Women's sitting volleyball
Representing United States
Paralympic Games
Gold medal – first place	2020 Tokyo	Sitting volleyball

Annie Flood (born May 16, 2003) is an American Paralympic volleyballist. At the age of 18, Flood won a gold medal at the 2020 Summer Paralympics.

== Early life ==
Flood was born on May 16, 2003, in Salem, Oregon to parents Jeff and Linda. Flood was born with fibular hemimelia and learned to walk on a prosthetic leg. When she was 10 years old, Flood received her first grant for an athletic leg which she used to play soccer and run.

== Career ==
Flood was introduced to sitting volleyball through a summer camp in Ohio in 2016. Shortly thereafter, she started training in the National Team A2 program and about a year later started training with the US national team. During her senior year at South Salem High School, Flood was a member of the gold medal-winning sitting volleyball team at the 2020 Summer Paralympics. Following the Games, she returned to North America to attend Linfield University for a degree in intensive care nursing.
