= Rwanda at the 2016 Summer Paralympics =

- IPC code: RWA
- NPC: National Paralympic Committee of Rwanda

in Rio de Janeiro
- Competitors: 13 in 2 sports
- Medals: Gold 0 Silver 0 Bronze 0 Total 0

Summer Paralympics appearances (overview)
- 2000; 2004; 2008; 2012; 2016; 2020; 2024

Rwanda competed at the 2016 Summer Paralympics in Rio de Janeiro, Brazil, from 7 September to 18 September 2016.

== Funding and support ==
The Rwanda Paralympic Committee was an Agitos Grant Award recipient, with the funding going towards athlete pathway development for Rio and Tokyo. The funding benefited 900 athletes around the country, while it also went to training coaches, classifiers and referees in Rwanda.

The Rwanda NPC has a goal of sending its largest ever Paralympic delegation to Rio.

== Disability classifications ==
Every participant at the Paralympics has their disability grouped into one of five disability categories; amputation, the condition may be congenital or sustained through injury or illness; cerebral palsy; wheelchair athletes, there is often overlap between this and other categories; visual impairment, including blindness; Les autres, any physical disability that does not fall strictly under one of the other categories, for example dwarfism or multiple sclerosis. Each Paralympic sport then has its own classifications, dependent upon the specific physical demands of competition. Events are given a code, made of numbers and letters, describing the type of event and classification of the athletes competing. Some sports, such as athletics, divide athletes by both the category and severity of their disabilities, other sports, for example swimming, group competitors from different categories together, the only separation being based on the severity of the disability.

== Athletics ==
Hermas Cliff Muvunyi was selected to represent Rwanda at the 2016 Summer Paralympics in the T46 400m and 1500m events. Muyunyi qualified for Rio at the 2015 IPC Athletics World Championships in Doha, Qatar. Prior to the Games, he announced that he would retire at the conclusion of the Rio Games. Going into Rio, Muyunyi was based at the Amahoro National Stadium where he trained with Eric Karasira.

== Sitting volleyball ==
Rwanda women's national sitting volleyball team qualified for the 2016 Games after winning the African Championships.

Pos	Team	Pld	W	L	Pts	SW	SL	SR	SPW	SPL	SPR	Qualification
1	China	3	3	0	6	9	2	4.500	246	169	1.456	Semi-finals
2	United States	3	2	1	5	8	3	2.667	256	156	1.641	Semi-finals
3	Iran	3	1	2	4	3	6	0.500	160	197	0.812	Classification 5th / 6th
4	Rwanda	3	0	3	3	0	9	0.000	85	225	0.378	Classification 7th / 8th

Source: Paralympic.org

10 September 2016; 10:00	China	3-0	Rwanda	Riocentro - Pavilion 6, Rio de Janeiro
10 September 2016; 10:00	(25–3, 25–8, 25–6); Report			Riocentro - Pavilion 6, Rio de Janeiro

12 September 2016; 10:00	Rwanda	0–3	Iran	Riocentro - Pavilion 6, Rio de Janeiro
12 September 2016; 10:00	(10–25, 19–25, 18–25); Report			Riocentro - Pavilion 6, Rio de Janeiro

14 September 2016; 10:00	United States	3–0	Rwanda	Riocentro - Pavilion 6, Rio de Janeiro
14 September 2016; 10:00	(25–10, 25–8, 25–3); Report			Riocentro - Pavilion 6, Rio de Janeiro

== See also ==
- Rwanda at the 2016 Summer Olympics
