= Rwanda at the 2020 Summer Paralympics =

- IPC code: RWA
- NPC: National Paralympic Committee of Rwanda
- Competitors: 12 in 1 sport
- Medals: Gold 0 Silver 0 Bronze 0 Total 0

Summer Paralympics appearances (overview)
- 2000; 2004; 2008; 2012; 2016; 2020; 2024

Rwanda competed at the 2020 Summer Paralympics in Tokyo, Japan, from 24 August and 5 September 2021. This was their sixth consecutive appearance at the Summer Paralympics since 2000.

== Sitting volleyball ==
Rwandan women's sitting volleyball team qualified for the 2020 Summer Paralympics after winning at the 2019 ParaVolley Africa Zonal Championships.

Summary

Team	Event	Group stage				Semifinal	Final / BM / Cl.	
Team	Event	Opposition Score	Opposition Score	Opposition Score	Rank	Opposition Score	Opposition Score	Rank
Rwanda women's	Women's tournament	United States; L 0–3	RPC; L 0–3	China; L 0–3	4	Did not advance	Japan; W 3–0	7

=== Women's tournament ===
Group play

Pos	Team	Pld	W	L	Pts	SW	SL	SR	SPW	SPL	SPR	Qualification
1	China	3	3	0	3	9	0	MAX	226	137	1.650	Semifinals
2	United States	3	2	1	2	6	3	2.000	213	163	1.307	Semifinals
3	RPC	3	1	2	1	3	6	0.500	181	180	1.006	Fifth place match
4	Rwanda	3	0	3	0	0	9	0.000	85	225	0.378	Seventh place match

Source: TOCOG

28 August 2021; 14:00 v	United States	3–0	Rwanda	Makuhari Messe, Tokyo; Referees: Barbara Pakuła (POL), Dominik Raca (CRO)
28 August 2021; 14:00 v	(25–11, 25–9, 25–11); Results Statistics			Makuhari Messe, Tokyo; Referees: Barbara Pakuła (POL), Dominik Raca (CRO)

30 August 2021; 10:00 v	Rwanda	0–3	RPC	Makuhari Messe, Tokyo; Referees: Barbara Pakuła (POL), Huang Xiao (CHN)
30 August 2021; 10:00 v	(9–25, 9–25, 12–25); Results Statistics			Makuhari Messe, Tokyo; Referees: Barbara Pakuła (POL), Huang Xiao (CHN)

1 September 2021; 14:00 v	China	3–0	Rwanda	Makuhari Messe, Tokyo; Referees: Andre Calado (BRA), Ritsuto Yamamichi (JPN)
1 September 2021; 14:00 v	(25–6, 25–10, 25–8); Results Statistics			Makuhari Messe, Tokyo; Referees: Andre Calado (BRA), Ritsuto Yamamichi (JPN)

Seventh place match

3 September 2021; 13:30 v	Japan	0–3	Rwanda	Makuhari Messe, Tokyo; Referees: Sari Mannersuo (FIN), Barbara Pakuła (POL)
3 September 2021; 13:30 v	(19–25, 21–25, 22–25); Results Statistics			Makuhari Messe, Tokyo; Referees: Sari Mannersuo (FIN), Barbara Pakuła (POL)

== See also ==
- Rwanda at the Paralympics
- Rwanda at the 2020 Summer Olympics
