= Jean de Dieu Nkundabera =

Rwandan Paralympic athlete

Medal record

Athletics

Representing Rwanda

Paralympic Games
Bronze medal – third place	2004 Athens	T46 800m

Jean de Dieu Nkundabera is a Rwandan athlete who competes in paralympic athletics.

Nkundabera represented Rwanda at the 2004 Summer Paralympics in Athens, and won his country's first ever Paralympic or Olympic medal in any sport, by taking bronze in the T46 men's 800 metre race, with a time of 1:58.95. He represented Rwanda again at the 2008 Summer Paralympics in Beijing.

As of 2016, Nkundabera remains Rwanda's sole Olympic or Paralympic medalist of any kind, despite Rwanda having a population of over 300,000 people with some sort of disability.
