= 2025 African Sitting Volleyball Championships – Women's tournament =

Sitting volleyball tournament in Kenya

2025 African Sitting Volleyball Championships

Tournament details
- Host country: Kenya
- City: Nairobi
- Dates: 4–9 July
- Teams: 2 (from 1 confederation)
- Venue: 1 (in 1 host city)

Final positions
- Champions: Rwanda (5th title)
- Runners-up: Kenya

Tournament awards
- MVP: (Rwanda) Liliane Mukobwankawe
- Best Setter: (Rwanda) Alice Musabyemariya
- Best Libero: (Rwanda) Hosiana Mulisa

Tournament statistics
- Matches played: 5
- Best spiker: (Rwanda) Carine Kwizera
- Best blocker: (Rwanda) Clementine Umutoni

The 2025 African Sitting Volleyball Championship – Women's tournament is the 6th edition of the biannual continental championship, contested by the senior men's national sitting volleyball teams in the Africa region, sanctioned by ParaVolley Africa. It was held in Nairobi, Kenya from 4 to 9 July 2025, marking the second time the event is held in the country, after 2010.

Two teams took part, one less than the previous edition.

The tournament acted as qualification for the 2026 Sitting Volleyball World Championships in Hangzhou, China, with two spots available. Since only two teams took part, hosts Kenya and Rwanda qualified automatically for the world championship.

Rwanda are the defending champions, after beating Kenya 3–0 in the 2023 final in Lagos. Rwanda won their fifth title after beating hosts Kenya 5–0 in a best of five series to defend their title.

== Teams ==
Two teams took part, one less than the previous edition. After taking part in 2024, Nigeria didn't take part as they withdrew shortly before the tournament. Congo and Zimbabwe were reportedly going to enter but this didn't materialise.

Team	Appearance(s)					Previous best performance (Note: Bold text indicates they hosted that edition.)
Team	Total	First	Last	Streak	2024	Previous best performance
Kenya (H)	6th	2010	2024	6	2nd	Runners-up (2010)
Rwanda	5th	2015	2024	5	1st	Champions (2015, 2017, 2019)

== Squads ==
=== Rwanda ===
Liliane Mukobwankawe
Carine Kwizera
Faustina Uwimpuhwe
Alice Musabyemariya
Claudine Murebwayire
Kevine Ishimwe
Hosiana Mulisa
Solange Nyiraneza
Assina Habyarimana
Marie Adeline Mucyo
Chancilline Umuyange
Rosa Uwase Uwajeneza
Clementine Umutoni
Rosine Umurerwa

== Venue ==
The tournament was held at the Kasarani Indoor Arena in Nairobi. The arena was built in 1987 and was constructed for the 1987 All-Africa Games held in the city.

2025 African Sitting Volleyball Championships – Women's tournament is located in Kenya	Nairobi
2025 African Sitting Volleyball Championships – Women's tournament is located in Kenya	Kasarani Indoor Arena
2025 African Sitting Volleyball Championships – Women's tournament is located in Kenya	Capacity: 5,000

== Best of five series ==
- As only two teams participated, a best of five series was held to decide the champion.
- All times are local.

Team 1	Series	Team 2	Game 1	Game 2	Game 3	Game 4	Game 5
Kenya	0–5	Rwanda	0–3	0–3	0–3	0–3	0–3

=== Matches ===
Date	Time		Score		Set 1	Set 2	Set 3	Set 4	Set 5	Total	Report
4 July	16:00	Kenya	0–3	Rwanda	16–25	18–25	20–25			54–75	Report
5 July	15:00	Rwanda	3–0	Kenya	25–13	25–16	25–18			75–47	Report
6 July	15:00	Kenya	0–3	Rwanda	21–25	23–25	16–25			60–75	Report
8 July	15:00	Rwanda	3–0	Kenya	25–15	25–18	25–17			75–50	Report
9 July	16:00	Kenya	0–3	Rwanda	17–25	15–25	20–25			52–75	Report

== Final rankings ==
As the only two that took part, Kenya and Rwanda qualified for the world championship before the tournament started.

Rank	Team
Gold medal	Rwanda
Silver medal	Kenya

Team Qualified for the 2026 Sitting Volleyball World Championships

== Aftermath ==
After hosting the championship, Kenya expressed interest in hosting a future world championship.

== See also ==
- 2025 African Sitting Volleyball Championships – Men's tournament
