= 2026 Sitting Volleyball World Championships – Women's event =

Sitting volleyball tournament in China

2026 Sitting Volleyball World Championships
2026 年坐式排球世界锦标赛

Tournament details
- Host country: China
- City: Hangzhou
- Dates: 10–17 July
- Teams: 16 (from 4 confederations)
- Venue: 1 (in 1 host city)

Final positions
- Champions: [[ women's sitting national volleyball team|]] (1st title)
- Runners-up: [[ women's sitting national volleyball team|]]
- Third place: [[ women's sitting national volleyball team|]]
- Fourth place: [[ women's sitting national volleyball team|]]

Tournament awards
- Best Setter: (Brazil) Gizele Dias
- Best Libero: (Brazil) Agata Godoy

The 2026 Sitting Volleyball World Championships – Women's event is the 9th edition of the quadrennial world championship, contested by the senior women's national sitting volleyball teams, sanctioned by World ParaVolley. It was held in Hangzhou, China from 10 to 17 July 2026, marking the first time the event is held in the country and the first time it was being held in East Asia.

16 teams took for the second time since the expansion in 2018, after withdrawals reduced the number of participating teams in the previous edition. Hosts China automatically qualified as hosts. Qualification took place between May and November 2025, with continental, world tournaments and rankings being used as qualification. France, Kenya and Thailand made their debut.

This was the first edition to implement video challenge system. On 11 July, the tournament was suspended for a day after Typhoon Bavi hit Hangzhou. Play commenced the next day with an updated schedule.

The winners secure a ticket to the 2028 Summer Paralympics.

Brazil are the defending champions, after beating Canada 3–2 in the 2022 final in Sarajevo.

== Host selection ==
After withdrawing from hosting the 2022 edition, Hangzhou was given the 2026 hosting rights instead. Hangzhou had already been stated as the host on the events section of the World ParaVolley website but it was made official in July 2025. This marks the first time the event is held in the country and the first and second time it will be held in East Asia and Asia respectively.

=== Quotes ===
“We sincerely appreciate WPV’s trust and support in entrusting us with hosting the 2026 WPV Sitting Volleyball World Championship! We will go all out, prepare with great care, and strive to present a wonderful and successful sports event!”

— Lu Cailiang, president of ParaVolley Asia-Oceania and director of the World ParaVolley Development Centre, Hangzhou.

“After an extensive dialogue with the local organizing committee we are extremely happy to announce the contract signature for the 2026 Sitting Volleyball World Championships for Women and Men. Hangzhou has already successfully hosted this year’s ParaVolley Asia-Oceania Zonal Championships. The Worlds will kick us off into the qualification race for the LA28 Paralympics – so we can expect thrilling matches for the global crown and for the first tickets to LA28 to be awarded.”

— Juergen Schrapp, President of World ParaVolley.

“I am excited that the 2026 World Championships will be held in Hangzhou, China. It’s the first time the World Championships have been held in Asia, the first of our LA28 qualification events, and the first time that the challenge system will be used at this level of event. It is a great facility, so we expect some spectacular matches between our teams that have already been qualifying via their 2025 Zonal Championships.

— Stephen Giugni, Sport Director of World ParaVolley.

== Preparations ==
- On 29 July 2025, the host contract was signed.
- On 7 July 2026, the official website went live.

=== Opening ceremony ===
On 9 July 2026, a day before the competition started, the opening ceremony took place. The opening ceremony consisted of dances where the performers wore traditional costumes. Live piano and violins were also played. As tradition, the parade of nations took place.

==== Quotes ====
"The preparation for these championships has been outstanding. Together, we are delivering one of the most technologically advanced World ParaVolley events ever staged, featuring comprehensive video challenge coverage, enhanced broadcast and streaming production, and expanded digital and social media engagement that will allow fans around the world to experience our sport like never before"

— Juergen Schrapp, World ParaVolley president.

== Qualification ==
=== Slot allocation ===
- Host nation: 1
- 2024 Summer Paralympics champions: 1
- 2028 Summer Paralympics hosts: 1
- ParaVolley Asia Oceania: 2
- ParaVolley Africa: 2
- ParaVolley Americas: 2
- ParaVolley Europe: 3
- 2025 World Cup: 2
- World rankings: 2

16 teams will take part for the second time since the expansion in 2018, after withdrawals reduced the number of participating teams in the previous edition. Hosts China automatically qualified as hosts. Qualification took place between May and November 2025, with continental, world tournaments and rankings being used as qualification. A total of 21 countries took part in qualification. As the United States took two spots after winning the 2024 Summer Paralympics and being the hosts of the 2028 Paralympics, one vacant spot was reallocated to the world rankings. Since only one team in the 2025 World Cup event hadn't already qualified, the remaining spot was once again was reallocated to the world rankings, bringing the number of teams qualifying via the world rankings to four.

Of the qualified teams, 10 took part in 2022. 2024 Paralympics host France, alongside Kenya and Thailand will make their debut, with the latter marking the first time a team from Southeast Asia qualified. Hosts, China, Japan and Netherlands return after missing out on 2022 due to Covid.

Of the absentees, former runners-up, Finland, failed to qualify after not entering any qualifier. Previous hosts Bosnia and Herzegovina and Poland missed out after their sporadic appearance in 2022. Similar to 2022, Russia was banned from taking part in qualification.

For the first time, Iran qualified for the third successive time.

The highest ranked team to not qualify was Poland, ranked 16th, while the lowest ranked team to qualify was Kenya, placed 17th.

=== Qualified teams ===
Qualification	Host	Dates	Vacancies	Qualified
Host nation	(China) Hangzhou	29 July 2025	1	China
2024 Summer Paralympics	(France) Paris	29 August – 7 September 2024	~~1~~ 0	None
2028 Summer Paralympics hosts	(Peru) Lima	13 September 2017	1	United States
2025 Pan American Championships	(United States) Denver	24–27 May 2025	2	Brazil; Canada
2025 Asia and Oceania Championships	(China) Hangzhou	9–14 June 2025	2	Iran; Japan
2025 African Championships	(Kenya) Nairobi	4–9 July 2025	2	Rwanda; Kenya
2025 European Championships	(Hungary) Győr	28 July – 2 August 2025	3	Italy; Netherlands; Ukraine
2025 World Cup	(United States) Fort Wayne	12–18 October 2025	~~2~~ 1	Germany
World rankings		12 November 2025	~~2~~ 4	Slovenia; France; Thailand; Hungary

=== World rankings ===
The final 4 places belonged to the top 4 teams as per the sitting volleyball world rankings who had not yet qualified as of 12 November 2025.

==== Top 20 in world rankings ====
Qualified for the 2026 Sitting Volleyball World Championships
Qualified for the 2026 Sitting Volleyball World Championships via World Ranking

Rank	Team	Points
1	United States	5,165
2	Canada	4,554
3	Brazil	4,358
4	Italy	4,108
5	Slovenia	3,091
6	Germany	2,938
7	China	2,800
8	Rwanda	2,784
9	Iran	2,411
10	Ukraine	2,386
11	Japan	1,440
12	France	1,418
13	Thailand	1,261
14	Hungary	1,123
15	Netherlands	1,042
16	Poland	1,039
17	Kenya	900
18	South Korea	662
19	Mongolia	626
20	Finland	584

=== Summary of qualified teams ===
Team	Qualification method	Date of qualification	Appearance(s)				Previous best performance (Note: Bold text indicates they hosted that edition.)	WR
Team	Qualification method	Date of qualification	Total	First	Last	Streak	Previous best performance	WR
China	Host nation	6 February 2025	6th	2002	2018	1	Champions (2010, 2014)	7
United States	2028 Summer Paralympics hosts	6 February 2025	6th	2006	2022	5	Runners-up (2010, 2014, 2018)	1
Brazil	2025 Pan American Championships	27 May 2025	6th	2006	2022	6	Champions (2022)	3
Canada	2025 Pan American Championships	27 May 2025	4th	2010	2022	3	Runners-up (2022)	2
Iran	2025 Asia and Oceania Championships	13 June 2025	5th	2000	2022	3	Eighth place (2000, 2002)	9
Japan	2025 Asia and Oceania Championships	14 June 2025	3rd	2000	2018	1	Fifth place (2000)	11
Kenya	2025 African Championships	9 July 2025	1st	Debut				9
Rwanda	2025 African Championships	9 July 2025	3rd	2018	2022	3	Eighth place (2022)	8
Italy	2025 European Championships	1 August 2025	3rd	2018	2022	3	Fourth place (2018)	4
Netherlands	2025 European Championships	1 August 2025	8th	1994	2018	1	Champions (1994, 2000, 2002, 2006)	15
Ukraine	2025 European Championships	2 August 2025	9th	1994	2022	9	Third place (2010)	10
Germany	2025 World Cup	18 October 2025	7th	1994	2022	5	Fourth place (2000)	6
Slovenia	World rankings	12 November 2025	7th	2002	2022	7	Runners-up (2002)	5
France	World rankings	12 November 2025	1st	Debut				12
Thailand	World rankings	12 November 2025	1st	Debut				13
Hungary	World rankings	12 November 2025	3rd	2018	2022	3	Eleventh place (2022)	14

== Composition of teams ==
On 15 March 2026, the pools were announced. The groups were decided via the Serpentine system. As hosts, China is seeded into position 1.

Pool A
Seed	WR	Team
1	7	China (H)
8	8	Rwanda
9	9	Iran
16	17	Kenya

Pool B
Seed	WR	Team
2	1	United States
7	6	Germany
10	10	Ukraine
15	15	Netherlands

Pool C
Seed	WR	Team
3	2	Canada
6	5	Slovenia
11	11	Japan
14	14	Hungary

Pool D
Seed	WR	Team
4	3	Brazil
5	4	Italy
12	12	France
13	13	Thailand

=== Schedule ===
The schedule was announced on 17 June. Due to Typhoon Bavi, the schedule was later adjusted.

Schedule
Round	Matchday	Date
Preliminary round	All matches	10–13 July 2026
Knockout stage	Round of 16	14 July 2026
Knockout stage	Quarterfinals	15 July 2026
Knockout stage	Semifinals	16 July 2026
Knockout stage	3rd place & Final	17 July 2026

Original schedule
Round	Matchday	Date
Preliminary round	All matches	10–12 July 2026
Knockout stage	Round of 16	13 July 2026
Knockout stage	Quarterfinals	14 July 2026
Knockout stage	Semifinals	15 July 2026
Knockout stage	Third place	16 July 2026
Final	17 July 2026	

== Venue ==
The World ParaVolley Development Centre in Hangzhou was the venue. The venue hosted the 2017 and 2025 Asia and Oceania Sitting Volleyball Championships, plus the 2017 World ParaVolley Women's Super 6. The venue has also hosted numerous other events in other Paralympic sports. Three courts were used during the event.

2026 Sitting Volleyball World Championships – Women's event is located in China	Hangzhou
2026 Sitting Volleyball World Championships – Women's event is located in China	World ParaVolley Development Centre
2026 Sitting Volleyball World Championships – Women's event is located in China	Capacity: Unknown

== Format ==
16 teams are split into four groups of four, where every team advances to the Round of 16. In the Round of 16, teams who finished 1st play the teams that finished fourth, and the teams who finished 2nd play the teams that finished third. The eight winners advance to the Quarter Finals, while the eight losers play in a 9–16 classification bracket.

== Group stage ==
- All times are local.
- The top four teams in each pool qualify for the final round.
- Match won 3–0 or 3–1: 3 match points for the winner, 0 match points for the loser
- Match won 3–2: 2 match points for the winner, 1 match point for the loser

=== Tiebreakers ===
1. Number of matches won
2. Match points
3. Sets ratio
4. Points ratio
5. If the tie continues as per the point ratio between two teams, the priority is given to the team which won the match between them. When the tie in points ratio is between three or more teams, a new classification of these teams in the terms of points 1, 2, 3 and 4 is made taking into consideration only the matches in which they were opposed to each other.

=== Pool A ===
Pos	Team	Pld	W	L	Pts	SW	SL	SR	SPW	SPL	SPR
1	China (H)	3	3	0	9	9	0	MAX	0	0	—
2	Iran	3	2	1	6	6	4	1.500	75	33	2.273
3	Rwanda	3	1	2	3	3	7	0.429	33	75	0.440
4	Kenya	3	0	3	0	2	9	0.222	2	9	0.222

Source: 2026 Sitting Volleyball World Championships
(H) Host

10 July 2026; 09:00	Rwanda	0–3	Iran	World ParaVolley Development Centre Court 1, Hangzhou; Referees: Ritsuto Yamamichi , Krisztina Arpas
10 July 2026; 09:00	(11–25, 11–25, 11–25); Report PDF			World ParaVolley Development Centre Court 1, Hangzhou; Referees: Ritsuto Yamamichi , Krisztina Arpas
10 July 2026; 09:00	Scoring leaders			World ParaVolley Development Centre Court 1, Hangzhou; Referees: Ritsuto Yamamichi , Krisztina Arpas
Mukobwankawe 7		Total	Nejatiaref 19
Mukobwankawe (4/17)		Attack	Heidari (11/17)
Mukobwankawe 3		Block	Khalilzadeh 2
Mucyo (2/6)		Serve	Nejatiaref (11/26)

10 July 2026; 19:00	China	3–0	Kenya	World ParaVolley Development Centre Court 1, Hangzhou; Referees: Kateryna Hranko , Khalid Shanisha
10 July 2026; 19:00	(25–8, 25–14, 25–4); Report PDF			World ParaVolley Development Centre Court 1, Hangzhou; Referees: Kateryna Hranko , Khalid Shanisha
10 July 2026; 19:00	Scoring leaders			World ParaVolley Development Centre Court 1, Hangzhou; Referees: Kateryna Hranko , Khalid Shanisha
Hu, L. Zhang 19		Total	Wambui 7
L. Zhang (15/23)		Attack	Adiwour (4/10)
Gao 2		Block	Wambui 6
Hu (6/21)		Serve	Sifuna (1/6)

12 July 2026; 16:30	Kenya	1–3	Iran	World ParaVolley Development Centre, Hangzhou; Referees: Ritsuto Yamamichi , Andre Calado
12 July 2026; 16:30	(25–21, 8–25, 7–25, 16–25); Report PDF			World ParaVolley Development Centre, Hangzhou; Referees: Ritsuto Yamamichi , Andre Calado
12 July 2026; 16:30	Scoring leaders			World ParaVolley Development Centre, Hangzhou; Referees: Ritsuto Yamamichi , Andre Calado
Wanjiku, Sifuna 9		Total	Heidari 20
Nafula (5/16)		Attack	Nejatiaref (13/17)
Wanjiku 5		Block	Khalilzadeh 3
Adiwour (3/13)		Serve	Heidari (8/20)

12 July 2026; 20:30	China	3–0	Rwanda	World ParaVolley Development Centre Court 2, Hangzhou; Referees: Christina Fiebich , Shaine Gimbo Sylvia
12 July 2026; 20:30	(25–13, 25–12, 25–11); Report PDF			World ParaVolley Development Centre Court 2, Hangzhou; Referees: Christina Fiebich , Shaine Gimbo Sylvia
12 July 2026; 20:30	Scoring leaders			World ParaVolley Development Centre Court 2, Hangzhou; Referees: Christina Fiebich , Shaine Gimbo Sylvia
L. Zhang 18		Total	three players 3
L. Zhang (13/23)		Attack	Mukobwankawe (3/13)
four players 1		Block	Mucyo, Umutoni 2
Hu (4/14)		Serve	Nyiraneza (1/10)

13 July 2026	N/A	–	N/A	World ParaVolley Development Centre, Hangzhou
13 July 2026	(–, –, –, –, –) [ Report] [ PDF]			World ParaVolley Development Centre, Hangzhou
13 July 2026	Scoring leaders			World ParaVolley Development Centre, Hangzhou
(0/0)		Attack	(0/0)
(0/0)		Serve	(0/0)

13 July 2026	N/A	–	N/A	World ParaVolley Development Centre, Hangzhou
13 July 2026	(–, –, –, –, –) [ Report] [ PDF]			World ParaVolley Development Centre, Hangzhou
13 July 2026	Scoring leaders			World ParaVolley Development Centre, Hangzhou
(0/0)		Attack	(0/0)
(0/0)		Serve	(0/0)

=== Pool B ===
Pos	Team	Pld	W	L	Pts	SW	SL	SR	SPW	SPL	SPR
1	United States	3	3	0	9	9	1	9.000	9	1	9.000
2	Ukraine	3	2	1	5	6	5	1.200	6	5	1.200
3	Germany	3	1	2	2	3	8	0.375	3	8	0.375
4	Netherlands	3	0	3	2	5	9	0.556	5	9	0.556

Source: 2026 Sitting Volleyball World Championships

10 July 2026	N/A	–	N/A	World ParaVolley Development Centre, Hangzhou
10 July 2026	(–, –, –, –, –) [ Report] [ PDF]			World ParaVolley Development Centre, Hangzhou
10 July 2026	Scoring leaders			World ParaVolley Development Centre, Hangzhou
(0/0)		Attack	(0/0)
(0/0)		Serve	(0/0)

10 July 2026	N/A	–	N/A	World ParaVolley Development Centre, Hangzhou
10 July 2026	(–, –, –, –, –) [ Report] [ PDF]			World ParaVolley Development Centre, Hangzhou
10 July 2026	Scoring leaders			World ParaVolley Development Centre, Hangzhou
(0/0)		Attack	(0/0)
(0/0)		Serve	(0/0)

12 July 2026	N/A	–	N/A	World ParaVolley Development Centre, Hangzhou
12 July 2026	(–, –, –, –, –) [ Report] [ PDF]			World ParaVolley Development Centre, Hangzhou
12 July 2026	Scoring leaders			World ParaVolley Development Centre, Hangzhou
(0/0)		Attack	(0/0)
(0/0)		Serve	(0/0)

12 July 2026	N/A	–	N/A	World ParaVolley Development Centre, Hangzhou
12 July 2026	(–, –, –, –, –) [ Report] [ PDF]			World ParaVolley Development Centre, Hangzhou
12 July 2026	Scoring leaders			World ParaVolley Development Centre, Hangzhou
(0/0)		Attack	(0/0)
(0/0)		Serve	(0/0)

13 July 2026	N/A	–	N/A	World ParaVolley Development Centre, Hangzhou
13 July 2026	(–, –, –, –, –) [ Report] [ PDF]			World ParaVolley Development Centre, Hangzhou
13 July 2026	Scoring leaders			World ParaVolley Development Centre, Hangzhou
(0/0)		Attack	(0/0)
(0/0)		Serve	(0/0)

13 July 2026	N/A	–	N/A	World ParaVolley Development Centre, Hangzhou
13 July 2026	(–, –, –, –, –) [ Report] [ PDF]			World ParaVolley Development Centre, Hangzhou
13 July 2026	Scoring leaders			World ParaVolley Development Centre, Hangzhou
(0/0)		Attack	(0/0)
(0/0)		Serve	(0/0)

=== Pool C ===
Pos	Team	Pld	W	L	Pts	SW	SL	SR	SPW	SPL	SPR
1	Canada	3	3	0	9	9	0	MAX	9	0	MAX
2	Japan	3	2	1	5	6	6	1.000	6	4	1.500
3	Slovenia	3	1	2	3	4	6	0.667	4	7	0.571
4	Hungary	3	0	3	0	1	9	0.111	1	9	0.111

Source: 2026 Sitting Volleyball World Championships

10 July 2026	N/A	–	N/A	World ParaVolley Development Centre, Hangzhou
10 July 2026	(–, –, –, –, –) [ Report] [ PDF]			World ParaVolley Development Centre, Hangzhou
10 July 2026	Scoring leaders			World ParaVolley Development Centre, Hangzhou
(0/0)		Attack	(0/0)
(0/0)		Serve	(0/0)

10 July 2026	N/A	–	N/A	World ParaVolley Development Centre, Hangzhou
10 July 2026	(–, –, –, –, –) [ Report] [ PDF]			World ParaVolley Development Centre, Hangzhou
10 July 2026	Scoring leaders			World ParaVolley Development Centre, Hangzhou
(0/0)		Attack	(0/0)
(0/0)		Serve	(0/0)

12 July 2026	N/A	–	N/A	World ParaVolley Development Centre, Hangzhou
12 July 2026	(–, –, –, –, –) [ Report] [ PDF]			World ParaVolley Development Centre, Hangzhou
12 July 2026	Scoring leaders			World ParaVolley Development Centre, Hangzhou
(0/0)		Attack	(0/0)
(0/0)		Serve	(0/0)

12 July 2026	N/A	–	N/A	World ParaVolley Development Centre, Hangzhou
12 July 2026	(–, –, –, –, –) [ Report] [ PDF]			World ParaVolley Development Centre, Hangzhou
12 July 2026	Scoring leaders			World ParaVolley Development Centre, Hangzhou
(0/0)		Attack	(0/0)
(0/0)		Serve	(0/0)

13 July 2026	N/A	–	N/A	World ParaVolley Development Centre, Hangzhou
13 July 2026	(–, –, –, –, –) [ Report] [ PDF]			World ParaVolley Development Centre, Hangzhou
13 July 2026	Scoring leaders			World ParaVolley Development Centre, Hangzhou
(0/0)		Attack	(0/0)
(0/0)		Serve	(0/0)

13 July 2026	N/A	–	N/A	World ParaVolley Development Centre, Hangzhou
13 July 2026	(–, –, –, –, –) [ Report] [ PDF]			World ParaVolley Development Centre, Hangzhou
13 July 2026	Scoring leaders			World ParaVolley Development Centre, Hangzhou
(0/0)		Attack	(0/0)
(0/0)		Serve	(0/0)

=== Pool D ===
Pos	Team	Pld	W	L	Pts	SW	SL	SR	SPW	SPL	SPR
1	Brazil	3	3	0	9	9	0	MAX	9	0	MAX
2	Italy	3	2	1	6	6	3	2.000	6	3	2.000
3	Thailand	3	1	2	3	3	7	0.429	3	7	0.429
4	France	3	0	3	0	1	9	0.111	1	9	0.111

Source: 2026 Sitting Volleyball World Championships

10 July 2026	N/A	–	N/A	World ParaVolley Development Centre, Hangzhou
10 July 2026	(–, –, –, –, –) [ Report] [ PDF]			World ParaVolley Development Centre, Hangzhou
10 July 2026	Scoring leaders			World ParaVolley Development Centre, Hangzhou
(0/0)		Attack	(0/0)
(0/0)		Serve	(0/0)

10 July 2026	N/A	–	N/A	World ParaVolley Development Centre, Hangzhou
10 July 2026	(–, –, –, –, –) [ Report] [ PDF]			World ParaVolley Development Centre, Hangzhou
10 July 2026	Scoring leaders			World ParaVolley Development Centre, Hangzhou
(0/0)		Attack	(0/0)
(0/0)		Serve	(0/0)

11 July 2026	N/A	–	N/A	World ParaVolley Development Centre, Hangzhou
11 July 2026	(–, –, –, –, –) [ Report] [ PDF]			World ParaVolley Development Centre, Hangzhou
11 July 2026	Scoring leaders			World ParaVolley Development Centre, Hangzhou
(0/0)		Attack	(0/0)
(0/0)		Serve	(0/0)

11 July 2026	N/A	–	N/A	World ParaVolley Development Centre, Hangzhou
11 July 2026	(–, –, –, –, –) [ Report] [ PDF]			World ParaVolley Development Centre, Hangzhou
11 July 2026	Scoring leaders			World ParaVolley Development Centre, Hangzhou
(0/0)		Attack	(0/0)
(0/0)		Serve	(0/0)

13 July 2026	N/A	–	N/A	World ParaVolley Development Centre, Hangzhou
13 July 2026	(–, –, –, –, –) [ Report] [ PDF]			World ParaVolley Development Centre, Hangzhou
13 July 2026	Scoring leaders			World ParaVolley Development Centre, Hangzhou
(0/0)		Attack	(0/0)
(0/0)		Serve	(0/0)

13 July 2026	N/A	–	N/A	World ParaVolley Development Centre, Hangzhou
13 July 2026	(–, –, –, –, –) [ Report] [ PDF]			World ParaVolley Development Centre, Hangzhou
13 July 2026	Scoring leaders			World ParaVolley Development Centre, Hangzhou
(0/0)		Attack	(0/0)
(0/0)		Serve	(0/0)

== Knockout stage ==
=== Bracket ===
Round of 16
14 July
China	3
Netherlands	0
14 July
Japan	3
Thailand	1
14 July
Brazil	3
Hungary	0
14 July
Ukraine	3
Rwanda	0
14 July
Canada	3
France	0
14 July
Iran	3
Germany	0
14 July
United States	3
Kenya	0
14 July
Italy	3
Slovenia	0

Quarterfinals
15 July
China	3
Japan	0
15 July
Brazil	3
Ukraine	0
15 July
Canada	3
Iran	0
15 July
United States	3
Italy	1

Semifinals
16 July
China	0
Brazil	3
16 July
Canada	0
United States	3

Final
17 July
Brazil	1
United States	3
Third place game
17 July
China	3
Canada	0

=== Round of 16 ===
14 July 2026	N/A	–	N/A	World ParaVolley Development Centre, Hangzhou
14 July 2026	(–, –, –, –, –) [ Report] [ PDF]			World ParaVolley Development Centre, Hangzhou
14 July 2026	Scoring leaders			World ParaVolley Development Centre, Hangzhou
(0/0)		Attack	(0/0)
(0/0)		Serve	(0/0)

14 July 2026	N/A	–	N/A	World ParaVolley Development Centre, Hangzhou
14 July 2026	(–, –, –, –, –) [ Report] [ PDF]			World ParaVolley Development Centre, Hangzhou
14 July 2026	Scoring leaders			World ParaVolley Development Centre, Hangzhou
(0/0)		Attack	(0/0)
(0/0)		Serve	(0/0)

14 July 2026	N/A	–	N/A	World ParaVolley Development Centre, Hangzhou
14 July 2026	(–, –, –, –, –) [ Report] [ PDF]			World ParaVolley Development Centre, Hangzhou
14 July 2026	Scoring leaders			World ParaVolley Development Centre, Hangzhou
(0/0)		Attack	(0/0)
(0/0)		Serve	(0/0)

14 July 2026	N/A	–	N/A	World ParaVolley Development Centre, Hangzhou
14 July 2026	(–, –, –, –, –) [ Report] [ PDF]			World ParaVolley Development Centre, Hangzhou
14 July 2026	Scoring leaders			World ParaVolley Development Centre, Hangzhou
(0/0)		Attack	(0/0)
(0/0)		Serve	(0/0)

14 July 2026	N/A	–	N/A	World ParaVolley Development Centre, Hangzhou
14 July 2026	(–, –, –, –, –) [ Report] [ PDF]			World ParaVolley Development Centre, Hangzhou
14 July 2026	Scoring leaders			World ParaVolley Development Centre, Hangzhou
(0/0)		Attack	(0/0)
(0/0)		Serve	(0/0)

14 July 2026	N/A	–	N/A	World ParaVolley Development Centre, Hangzhou
14 July 2026	(–, –, –, –, –) [ Report] [ PDF]			World ParaVolley Development Centre, Hangzhou
14 July 2026	Scoring leaders			World ParaVolley Development Centre, Hangzhou
(0/0)		Attack	(0/0)
(0/0)		Serve	(0/0)

14 July 2026	N/A	–	N/A	World ParaVolley Development Centre, Hangzhou
14 July 2026	(–, –, –, –, –) [ Report] [ PDF]			World ParaVolley Development Centre, Hangzhou
14 July 2026	Scoring leaders			World ParaVolley Development Centre, Hangzhou
(0/0)		Attack	(0/0)
(0/0)		Serve	(0/0)

14 July 2026	N/A	–	N/A	World ParaVolley Development Centre, Hangzhou
14 July 2026	(–, –, –, –, –) [ Report] [ PDF]			World ParaVolley Development Centre, Hangzhou
14 July 2026	Scoring leaders			World ParaVolley Development Centre, Hangzhou
(0/0)		Attack	(0/0)
(0/0)		Serve	(0/0)

=== Quarterfinals ===
15 July 2026	N/A	–	N/A	World ParaVolley Development Centre, Hangzhou
15 July 2026	(–, –, –, –, –) [ Report] [ PDF]			World ParaVolley Development Centre, Hangzhou
15 July 2026	Scoring leaders			World ParaVolley Development Centre, Hangzhou
(0/0)		Attack	(0/0)
(0/0)		Serve	(0/0)

15 July 2026	N/A	–	N/A	World ParaVolley Development Centre, Hangzhou
15 July 2026	(–, –, –, –, –) [ Report] [ PDF]			World ParaVolley Development Centre, Hangzhou
15 July 2026	Scoring leaders			World ParaVolley Development Centre, Hangzhou
(0/0)		Attack	(0/0)
(0/0)		Serve	(0/0)

15 July 2026	N/A	–	N/A	World ParaVolley Development Centre, Hangzhou
15 July 2026	(–, –, –, –, –) [ Report] [ PDF]			World ParaVolley Development Centre, Hangzhou
15 July 2026	Scoring leaders			World ParaVolley Development Centre, Hangzhou
(0/0)		Attack	(0/0)
(0/0)		Serve	(0/0)

15 July 2026	N/A	–	N/A	World ParaVolley Development Centre, Hangzhou
15 July 2026	(–, –, –, –, –) [ Report] [ PDF]			World ParaVolley Development Centre, Hangzhou
15 July 2026	Scoring leaders			World ParaVolley Development Centre, Hangzhou
(0/0)		Attack	(0/0)
(0/0)		Serve	(0/0)

=== Semifinals ===
16 July 2026	N/A	–	N/A	World ParaVolley Development Centre, Hangzhou
16 July 2026	(–, –, –, –, –) [ Report] [ PDF]			World ParaVolley Development Centre, Hangzhou
16 July 2026	Scoring leaders			World ParaVolley Development Centre, Hangzhou
(0/0)		Attack	(0/0)
(0/0)		Serve	(0/0)

16 July 2026	N/A	–	N/A	World ParaVolley Development Centre, Hangzhou
16 July 2026	(–, –, –, –, –) [ Report] [ PDF]			World ParaVolley Development Centre, Hangzhou
16 July 2026	Scoring leaders			World ParaVolley Development Centre, Hangzhou
(0/0)		Attack	(0/0)
(0/0)		Serve	(0/0)

=== Third place game ===
17 July 2026	N/A	–	N/A	World ParaVolley Development Centre, Hangzhou
17 July 2026	(–, –, –, –, –) [ Report] [ PDF]			World ParaVolley Development Centre, Hangzhou
17 July 2026	Scoring leaders			World ParaVolley Development Centre, Hangzhou
(0/0)		Attack	(0/0)
(0/0)		Serve	(0/0)

=== Final ===
17 July 2026	N/A	–	N/A	World ParaVolley Development Centre, Hangzhou
17 July 2026	(–, –, –, –, –) [ Report] [ PDF]			World ParaVolley Development Centre, Hangzhou
17 July 2026	Scoring leaders			World ParaVolley Development Centre, Hangzhou
(0/0)		Attack	(0/0)
(0/0)		Serve	(0/0)

=== Classification rounds ===
==== 5–8th place bracket ====
5–8th place semifinals
16 July
Japan	1
Ukraine	3
16 July
Iran	1
Italy	3

Fifth place game
17 July
Ukraine	1
Italy	3
Seventh place game
17 July
Japan	0
Iran	3

=== 5–8th place semifinals ===
16 July 2026	N/A	–	N/A	World ParaVolley Development Centre, Hangzhou
16 July 2026	(–, –, –, –, –) [ Report] [ PDF]			World ParaVolley Development Centre, Hangzhou
16 July 2026	Scoring leaders			World ParaVolley Development Centre, Hangzhou
(0/0)		Attack	(0/0)
(0/0)		Serve	(0/0)

16 July 2026	N/A	–	N/A	World ParaVolley Development Centre, Hangzhou
16 July 2026	(–, –, –, –, –) [ Report] [ PDF]			World ParaVolley Development Centre, Hangzhou
16 July 2026	Scoring leaders			World ParaVolley Development Centre, Hangzhou
(0/0)		Attack	(0/0)
(0/0)		Serve	(0/0)

=== Seventh place game ===
17 July 2026	N/A	–	N/A	World ParaVolley Development Centre, Hangzhou
17 July 2026	(–, –, –, –, –) [ Report] [ PDF]			World ParaVolley Development Centre, Hangzhou
17 July 2026	Scoring leaders			World ParaVolley Development Centre, Hangzhou
(0/0)		Attack	(0/0)
(0/0)		Serve	(0/0)

=== Fifth place game ===
17 July 2026	N/A	–	N/A	World ParaVolley Development Centre, Hangzhou
17 July 2026	(–, –, –, –, –) [ Report] [ PDF]			World ParaVolley Development Centre, Hangzhou
17 July 2026	Scoring leaders			World ParaVolley Development Centre, Hangzhou
(0/0)		Attack	(0/0)
(0/0)		Serve	(0/0)

==== 9–16th place bracket ====
9–16th place quarterfinals
15 July
Netherlands	3
Thailand	0
15 July
Hungary	0
Rwanda	3
15 July
France	0
Germany	3
15 July
Kenya	1
Slovenia	3

9–12th place semifinals
16 July
Netherlands	3
Rwanda	0
16 July
Germany	1
Slovenia	3

Ninth place game
17 July
Netherlands	3
Slovenia	1
Eleventh place game
17 July
Rwanda	3
Germany	2

=== 9–16th place quarterfinals ===
15 July 2026	N/A	–	N/A	World ParaVolley Development Centre, Hangzhou
15 July 2026	(–, –, –, –, –) [ Report] [ PDF]			World ParaVolley Development Centre, Hangzhou
15 July 2026	Scoring leaders			World ParaVolley Development Centre, Hangzhou
(0/0)		Attack	(0/0)
(0/0)		Serve	(0/0)

15 July 2026	N/A	–	N/A	World ParaVolley Development Centre, Hangzhou
15 July 2026	(–, –, –, –, –) [ Report] [ PDF]			World ParaVolley Development Centre, Hangzhou
15 July 2026	Scoring leaders			World ParaVolley Development Centre, Hangzhou
(0/0)		Attack	(0/0)
(0/0)		Serve	(0/0)

15 July 2026	N/A	–	N/A	World ParaVolley Development Centre, Hangzhou
15 July 2026	(–, –, –, –, –) [ Report] [ PDF]			World ParaVolley Development Centre, Hangzhou
15 July 2026	Scoring leaders			World ParaVolley Development Centre, Hangzhou
(0/0)		Attack	(0/0)
(0/0)		Serve	(0/0)

15 July 2026	N/A	–	N/A	World ParaVolley Development Centre, Hangzhou
15 July 2026	(–, –, –, –, –) [ Report] [ PDF]			World ParaVolley Development Centre, Hangzhou
15 July 2026	Scoring leaders			World ParaVolley Development Centre, Hangzhou
(0/0)		Attack	(0/0)
(0/0)		Serve	(0/0)

=== 9–12th place semifinals ===
16 July 2026	N/A	–	N/A	World ParaVolley Development Centre, Hangzhou
16 July 2026	(–, –, –, –, –) [ Report] [ PDF]			World ParaVolley Development Centre, Hangzhou
16 July 2026	Scoring leaders			World ParaVolley Development Centre, Hangzhou
(0/0)		Attack	(0/0)
(0/0)		Serve	(0/0)

16 July 2026	N/A	–	N/A	World ParaVolley Development Centre, Hangzhou
16 July 2026	(–, –, –, –, –) [ Report] [ PDF]			World ParaVolley Development Centre, Hangzhou
16 July 2026	Scoring leaders			World ParaVolley Development Centre, Hangzhou
(0/0)		Attack	(0/0)
(0/0)		Serve	(0/0)

=== Eleventh place game ===
17 July 2026	N/A	–	N/A	World ParaVolley Development Centre, Hangzhou
17 July 2026	(–, –, –, –, –) [ Report] [ PDF]			World ParaVolley Development Centre, Hangzhou
17 July 2026	Scoring leaders			World ParaVolley Development Centre, Hangzhou
(0/0)		Attack	(0/0)
(0/0)		Serve	(0/0)

=== Ninth place game ===
17 July 2026	N/A	–	N/A	World ParaVolley Development Centre, Hangzhou
17 July 2026	(–, –, –, –, –) [ Report] [ PDF]			World ParaVolley Development Centre, Hangzhou
17 July 2026	Scoring leaders			World ParaVolley Development Centre, Hangzhou
(0/0)		Attack	(0/0)
(0/0)		Serve	(0/0)

==== 13–16th place bracket ====
13–16th place semifinals
16 July
Thailand	3
Hungary	1
16 July
France	0
Kenya	3

13th place game
17 July
Thailand	2
Kenya	3
15th place game
17 July
Hungary	3
France	2

=== 13–16th place semifinals ===
16 July 2026	N/A	–	N/A	World ParaVolley Development Centre, Hangzhou
16 July 2026	(–, –, –, –, –) [ Report] [ PDF]			World ParaVolley Development Centre, Hangzhou
16 July 2026	Scoring leaders			World ParaVolley Development Centre, Hangzhou
(0/0)		Attack	(0/0)
(0/0)		Serve	(0/0)

16 July 2026	N/A	–	N/A	World ParaVolley Development Centre, Hangzhou
16 July 2026	(–, –, –, –, –) [ Report] [ PDF]			World ParaVolley Development Centre, Hangzhou
16 July 2026	Scoring leaders			World ParaVolley Development Centre, Hangzhou
(0/0)		Attack	(0/0)
(0/0)		Serve	(0/0)

=== 15th place game ===
17 July 2026	N/A	–	N/A	World ParaVolley Development Centre, Hangzhou
17 July 2026	(–, –, –, –, –) [ Report] [ PDF]			World ParaVolley Development Centre, Hangzhou
17 July 2026	Scoring leaders			World ParaVolley Development Centre, Hangzhou
(0/0)		Attack	(0/0)
(0/0)		Serve	(0/0)

=== 13th place game ===
17 July 2026	N/A	–	N/A	World ParaVolley Development Centre, Hangzhou
17 July 2026	(–, –, –, –, –) [ Report] [ PDF]			World ParaVolley Development Centre, Hangzhou
17 July 2026	Scoring leaders			World ParaVolley Development Centre, Hangzhou
(0/0)		Attack	(0/0)
(0/0)		Serve	(0/0)

== Final standings ==
=== Rankings table ===
Pos	Team	Pld	W	L	Pts	SW	SL	SR	SPW	SPL	SPR	Final result
1	United States	7	7	0	21	21	3	7.000	9	1	9.000	Champions
2	Brazil	7	6	1	18	19	3	6.333	9	0	MAX	Runners-up
3	China (H)	7	6	1	18	18	3	6.000	9	2	4.500	Third place
4	Canada	7	5	2	15	15	6	2.500	9	0	MAX	Fourth place
5	Italy	7	5	2	15	16	8	2.000	6	3	2.000	Fifth place game
6	Ukraine	7	4	3	11	13	12	1.083	6	5	1.200	Fifth place game
7	Iran	7	4	3	12	13	10	1.300	75	33	2.273	Seventh place game
8	Japan	7	3	4	8	10	16	0.625	6	4	1.500	Seventh place game
9	Netherlands	7	3	4	11	14	13	1.077	5	9	0.556	Ninth place game
10	Slovenia	7	3	4	9	11	14	0.786	4	7	0.571	Ninth place game
11	Rwanda	7	3	4	8	9	15	0.600	33	75	0.440	Eleventh place game
12	Germany	7	2	5	6	9	17	0.529	3	8	0.375	Eleventh place game
13	Kenya	7	2	5	5	9	17	0.529	2	9	0.222	Thirteenth place game
14	Thailand	7	2	5	7	9	17	0.529	3	7	0.429	Thirteenth place game
15	Hungary	7	1	6	2	5	20	0.250	1	9	0.111	Fifteenth place game
16	France	7	0	7	1	3	21	0.143	1	9	0.111	Fifteenth place game

Source: 2026 Sitting Volleyball World Championships
Rules for classification: 1) points; 2) head-to-head points; 3) head-to-head goal difference; 4) head-to-head number of goals scored; 5) Goal difference.
(H) Host

=== Qualification table ===
Rank	Team
1st place, gold medalist(s)	United States
2nd place, silver medalist(s)	Brazil
3rd place, bronze medalist(s)	China
4	Canada
5	Italy
6	Ukraine
7	Iran
8	Japan
9	Netherlands
10	Slovenia
11	Rwanda
12	Germany
13	Kenya
14	Thailand
15	Hungary
16	France

Qualified for the 2028 Summer Paralympics

2026 Sitting Volleyball World Championships

United States
1st title

Team roster: Players.
Head Coach: Coach

== See also ==
- 2026 Sitting Volleyball World Championships – Men's event
