= 2025 Sitting Volleyball World Cup – Women's event =

Sitting volleyball tournament in United States

2025 Sitting Volleyball World Cup

Tournament details
- Host country: United States
- City: Fort Wayne
- Dates: 12–18 October
- Teams: 6 (from 2 confederations)
- Venue: 1 (in 1 host city)

Final positions
- Champions: United States (3rd title)
- Runners-up: Brazil
- Third place: Italy
- Fourth place: Canada

Tournament awards
- MVP: (United States) Emma Schieck
- Best Setter: (Brazil) Gizele Dias
- Best Libero: (United States) Bethany Zummo

Tournament statistics
- Matches played: 20
- Best spiker: (United States) Nicole Nieves
- Best blocker: (Italy) Sara Cirelli
- Best server: (Canada) Heidi Amanda Peters
- Best receiver: (Netherlands) Anne Raben

The 2025 Sitting Volleyball World Cup – Women's event was the 6th edition of the biannual secondary world championship, contested by the senior women's national sitting volleyball teams, sanctioned by World ParaVolley. It was held in Fort Wayne, United States from 12 to 18 October 2025, marking the first time the event is held in the country and first time it was held in the Americas.

Six teams took part, four fewer than the previous edition.

The tournament acted as qualification for the 2026 Sitting Volleyball World Championships in Hangzhou, China, with two spots available.

China are the defending champions, after beating Canada 3–1 in the 2023 final in Cairo, but couldn't defend their title after not entering. United States won their third title after beating Brazil 3–2 in the final.

== Host selection ==
A call for the hosting rights was first said on 25 October 2024, with the deadline for submitting interest being on 30 November 2024. On 3 February 2025, American city, Fort Wayne, was given the hosting rights. This marks the first time the tournament will be in the United States and first time the event is in the Americas. The event is projected to generate $2.3 million for Allen County.

=== Quotes ===
“We are honored to work alongside WPV and Visit Fort Wayne to welcome the global Sitting ParaVolley community to Fort Wayne. Beyond the intense competition, this event exemplifies the power of inclusive sport and provides a transformational experience for our community.”

— Mike Mushett, CEO of Turnstone.

“Fort Wayne continues to be a recognized leader in hosting events that have a lasting and meaningful impact for participants and guests. We’re thrilled to welcome athletes from across the globe for this milestone opportunity for our community. The success of our local partners in securing the World Cup speaks to our city’s growing reputation as an inclusive, world-class destination for sports.”

— Sharon Tucker, mayor of Fort Wayne.

=== Preparations ===
- On 19 September 2025, tickets were released. One-day ticket passes were $15 while a tournament pass was $75.
- The deadline for obtaining media accreditation was 1 October 2025.

== Teams ==
Six teams took part, four less than the previous edition. Teams had to submit an interest in entering by 1 July 2025. On 14 August 2025, the teams were revealed. Italy will make their debut while hosts United States return after not participating in the last edition. China, Egypt, Mongolia, Rwanda, Slovenia and Ukraine all didn't enter after taking part in 2023.

Team	Appearance(s)					Previous best performance (Note: Bold text indicates they hosted that edition.)
Team	Total	First	Last	Streak	2023	Previous best performance
Brazil	4th	2012	2023	4	3rd	Third place (2016, 2023)
Canada	3rd	2016	2023	3	2nd	Runners-up (2023)
Germany	2nd	2023		2	4th	Fourth place (2023)
Italy	1st	Debut				
Netherlands	4th	2008	2023	2	9th	Champions (2008)
United States (H)	4th	2008	2016	1	N/A	Champions (2010, 2016)

== Venue ==
The venue is the Plassman Athletic Center in Fort Wayne. Two courts were used for the tournament.

2025 Sitting Volleyball World Cup – Women's event is located in the United States	Fort Wayne
2025 Sitting Volleyball World Cup – Women's event is located in the United States	Plassman Athletic Center
2025 Sitting Volleyball World Cup – Women's event is located in the United States	Capacity: Unknown

== Squads ==
=== United States ===
Bethany Zummo (L)
Alexis Patterson (S/L)
Maddy Ball (DS)
Tia Edwards (OH/MB)
Kari Ortiz (L)
Emma Schieck (OH)
Gia Cruz (S)
Kendra Hall
Nicky Nieves (MB/OH)
Jessie West (OH)
Courtney Baker (MH)
Annie Flood (S)
Raelene Elam (OH)

== Format ==
The six teams all play each other in one group where the top four will advance to the semifinals. The fifth and sixth place teams play in the fifth place game.

== Group stage ==
- All times are local.
- The top four teams qualify for the knockout stage.
- Match won 3–0 or 3–1: 3 match points for the winner, 0 match points for the loser
- Match won 3–2: 2 match points for the winner, 1 match point for the loser

=== Tiebreakers ===
1. Number of matches won
2. Match points
3. Sets ratio
4. Points ratio
5. If the tie continues as per the point ratio between two teams, the priority is given to the team which won the match between them. When the tie in points ratio is between three or more teams, a new classification of these teams in the terms of points 1, 2, 3 and 4 is made taking into consideration only the matches in which they were opposed to each other.

Pos	Team	Pld	W	L	Pts	SW	SL	SR	SPW	SPL	SPR	Qualification
1	Brazil	5	5	0	15	15	2	7.500	417	300	1.390	Semifinals
2	United States (H)	5	3	2	10	12	6	2.000	406	352	1.153	Semifinals
3	Canada	5	3	2	9	9	7	1.286	361	354	1.020	Semifinals
4	Italy	5	3	2	8	10	8	1.250	398	321	1.240	Semifinals
5	Germany	5	1	4	2	4	14	0.286	271	421	0.644	Fifth place match
6	Netherlands	5	0	5	1	2	15	0.133	297	402	0.739	Fifth place match

Source: 2025 Sitting Volleyball World Cup
(H) Host

Date	Time		Score		Set 1	Set 2	Set 3	Set 4	Set 5	Total	Report
12 October	13:30	Canada	3–0	Germany	25–19	25–21	25–18			75–58	Report
12 October	15:30	Brazil	3–0	Netherlands	25–9	25–17	25–16			75–42	Report
12 October	15:30	United States	2–3	Italy	25–18	25–18	22–25	17–25	14–16	103–102	Report
13 October	13:30	United States	3–0	Netherlands	25–19	25–20	25–13			75–52	Report
13 October	15:30	Canada	3–1	Italy	25–20	19–25	25–21	26–24		95–90	Report
13 October	15:30	Brazil	3–1	Germany	21–25	25–16	25–15	25–13		96–69	Report
14 October	13:30	Germany	3–2	Netherlands	15–25	22–25	25–17	25–23	15–10	102–100	Report
14 October	15:30	United States	3–0	Canada	25–13	26–24	25–23			76–60	Report
14 October	15:30	Brazil	3–0	Italy	25–18	25–21	25–17			75–56	Report
15 October	13:30	Italy	3–0	Netherlands	25–13	25–12	25–23			75–48	Report
15 October	13:30	United States	3–0	Germany	25–18	25–14	25–10			75–42	Report
15 October	15:30	Canada	0–3	Brazil	23–25	16–25	17–25			56–75	Report
16 October	13:30	Canada	3–0	Netherlands	25–20	25–15	25–20			75–55	Report
16 October	15:30	United States	1–3	Brazil	14–25	23–25	25–21	15–25		77–96	Report
16 October	15:30	Italy	3–0	Germany	25–0	25–0	25–0			75–0	Report

== Knockout stage ==
=== Fifth place match ===
Fifth place
17 October
Germany	3
Netherlands	1

Date	Time		Score		Set 1	Set 2	Set 3	Set 4	Set 5	Total	Report
17 October	11:00	Germany	3–1	Netherlands	25–17	23–25	26–24	25–23		99–89	Report

=== Bracket ===
Semifinals
17 October
Brazil	3
Italy	0
17 October
United States	3
Canada	0

Final
18 October
Brazil	2
United States	3
Third place
18 October
Italy	3
Canada	1

=== Semifinals ===
Date	Time		Score		Set 1	Set 2	Set 3	Set 4	Set 5	Total	Report
17 October	13:30	United States	3–0	Canada	25–17	25–14	25–22			75–53	Report
17 October	15:30	Brazil	3–0	Italy	25–14	25–15	25–7			75–36	Report

=== 3rd place match ===
Date	Time		Score		Set 1	Set 2	Set 3	Set 4	Set 5	Total	Report
18 October	10:00	Canada	1–3	Italy	26–24	20–25	13–25	18–25		77–99	Report

=== Final ===
Date	Time		Score		Set 1	Set 2	Set 3	Set 4	Set 5	Total	Report
18 October	17:00	United States	3–2	Brazil	24–26	20–25	25–18	25–20	15–12	109–101	Report

== Final rankings ==
Despite two spots being on offer for the world championship, only Germany qualified via this championship as everyone else qualified through another route. Therefore, the vacant qualification spot was redistributed to being another spot via the world rankings. Brazil achieved their best result, placing second.

Rank	Team
Gold medal	United States
Silver medal	Brazil
Bronze medal	Italy
4	Canada
5	Germany
6	Netherlands

Team Qualified for the 2026 Sitting Volleyball World Championships

== See also ==
- 2025 Sitting Volleyball World Cup – Men's event
