= 2025 Asia and Oceania Sitting Volleyball Championships =

The 2025 Asia and Oceania Sitting Volleyball Championships consists of two sections:

- 2025 Asia and Oceania Sitting Volleyball Championships – Men's tournament
- 2025 Asia and Oceania Sitting Volleyball Championships – Women's tournament
