= 2025 African Sitting Volleyball Championships – Men's tournament =

Sitting volleyball tournament in Kenya

2025 African Sitting Volleyball Championships

Tournament details
- Host country: Kenya
- City: Nairobi
- Dates: 4–9 July
- Teams: 6 (from 1 confederation)
- Venue: 1 (in 1 host city)

Final positions
- Champions: Egypt (11th title)
- Runners-up: Rwanda
- Third place: Algeria
- Fourth place: Morocco

Tournament awards
- Best Setter: (Rwanda) Emile Vuningabo
- Best Libero: (Rwanda) Jean Baptiste Ndayisaba

Tournament statistics
- Matches played: 11

The 2025 African Sitting Volleyball Championship – Men's tournament was the 11th edition of the biannual continental championship, contested by the senior men's national sitting volleyball teams in the Africa region, sanctioned by ParaVolley Africa. It was held in Nairobi, Kenya from 4 to 9 July 2025, marking the first time the event was held in the country.

Six teams took part, one less than the previous edition.

The tournament acted as qualification for the 2026 Sitting Volleyball World Championships in Hangzhou, China, with two spots available.

Egypt are the defending champions, after beating Morocco 3–0 in the 2023 final in Lagos. Egypt won their eleventh title after beating Rwanda 3–0 in the final to defend their title.

== Teams ==
Six teams took part, one less than the previous edition. After taking part in 2024, Libya and Nigeria didn't take part, while South Africa will be present after not taking part in 2024. Libya, Nigeria and Zimbabwe were reportedly going to enter but this didn't materialise.

| Team | Appearance(s) | | | | | Previous best performance (Note: Bold text indicates they hosted that edition.) |
| Team | Total | First | Last | Streak | 2024 | Previous best performance |
|---|---|---|---|---|---|---|
| Algeria | 4th | 2015 | 2024 | 3 | 4th | Third place (2015, 2019) |
| Egypt | 11th | 1998 | 2024 | 6 | 1st | Champions (1998, 2000, 2001, 2004, 2007, 2012, 2015, 2017, 2019, 2024) |
| Kenya (H) | 5th | 2011 | 2024 | 2 | 5th | Runners-up (2011) |
| Morocco | 10th | 1998 | 2024 | 3 | 2nd | Runners-up (2004, 2012, 2024) |
| Rwanda | 6th | 2011 | 2024 | 5 | 3rd | Champions (2011) |
| South Africa | 3rd | 2017 | 2019 | 1 | N/A | Fifth place (2019) |

== Squads ==
=== Rwanda ===
Emile Cadet Vuningabo
Jean Baptiste Ndayisaba
Celestin Byumvuhore
Jean Baptiste Murema
Callixte Twagirayezu
Ezra Kubwimana
Calixte Nzeyimana
Callixte Uwizeyimana
Christophe Nyagatare
Jean Semana
Jean Bosco Ngizwenimana
Innocent Niyitigeka
Jean Claude Ndahiro
Ismael Nkwaya
Pacifique Niyogushimwa.

== Venue ==
The tournament was held at the Kasarani Indoor Arena in Nairobi. The arena was built in 1987 and was constructed for the 1987 All-Africa Games held in the city.

| 2025 African Sitting Volleyball Championships – Men's tournament is located in Kenya | Nairobi |
|---|---|
| 2025 African Sitting Volleyball Championships – Men's tournament is located in Kenya | Kasarani Indoor Arena |
| 2025 African Sitting Volleyball Championships – Men's tournament is located in Kenya | Capacity: 5,000 |

== Group stage ==
- All times are local.
- The top two teams in each pool qualify for the semifinals.
- Match won 3–0 or 3–1: 3 match points for the winner, 0 match points for the loser
- Match won 3–2: 2 match points for the winner, 1 match point for the loser

=== Tiebreakers ===
1. Number of matches won
2. Match points
3. Sets ratio
4. Points ratio
5. If the tie continues as per the point ratio between two teams, the priority is given to the team which won the match between them. When the tie in points ratio is between three or more teams, a new classification of these teams in the terms of points 1, 2, 3 and 4 is made taking into consideration only the matches in which they were opposed to each other.

=== Pool A ===
| Pos | Team | Pld | W | L | Pts | SW | SL | SR | SPW | SPL | SPR | Qualification |
|---|---|---|---|---|---|---|---|---|---|---|---|---|
| 1 | Rwanda | 2 | 2 | 0 | 6 | 6 | 0 | MAX | 168 | 116 | 1.448 | Semifinals |
| 2 | Algeria | 2 | 1 | 1 | 3 | 3 | 3 | 1.000 | 162 | 174 | 0.931 | Semifinals |
| 3 | Kenya (H) | 2 | 0 | 2 | 0 | 0 | 6 | 0.000 | 163 | 203 | 0.803 | Fifth place match |

Source: 2025 African Sitting Volleyball Championships
(H) Host

| Date | Time | | Score | | Set 1 | Set 2 | Set 3 | Set 4 | Set 5 | Total | Report |
|---|---|---|---|---|---|---|---|---|---|---|---|
| 4 July | 18:00 | Kenya | 2–3 | Algeria | 14–25 | 27–25 | 20–25 | 25–20 | 13–15 | 99–110 | Report |
| 5 July | 17:00 | Algeria | 0–3 | Rwanda | 23–25 | 12–25 | 17–25 | | | 52–75 | Report |
| 6 July | 19:00 | Kenya | 1–3 | Rwanda | 17–25 | 12–25 | 25–18 | 10–25 | | 64–93 | Report |

=== Pool B ===
| Pos | Team | Pld | W | L | Pts | SW | SL | SR | SPW | SPL | SPR | Qualification |
|---|---|---|---|---|---|---|---|---|---|---|---|---|
| 1 | Egypt | 2 | 2 | 0 | 6 | 6 | 0 | MAX | 150 | 69 | 2.174 | Semifinals |
| 2 | Morocco | 2 | 1 | 1 | 3 | 3 | 3 | 1.000 | 118 | 113 | 1.044 | Semifinals |
| 3 | South Africa | 2 | 0 | 2 | 0 | 0 | 6 | 0.000 | 64 | 150 | 0.427 | Fifth place match |

Source: 2025 African Sitting Volleyball Championships

| Date | Time | | Score | | Set 1 | Set 2 | Set 3 | Set 4 | Set 5 | Total | Report |
|---|---|---|---|---|---|---|---|---|---|---|---|
| 4 July | 10:00 | Egypt | 3–0 | South Africa | 25–9 | 25–9 | 25–8 | | | 75–26 | Report |
| 5 July | 19:00 | Egypt | 3–0 | Morocco | 25–12 | 25–16 | 25–15 | | | 75–43 | Report |
| 6 July | 17:00 | Morocco | 3–0 | South Africa | 25–14 | 25–11 | 25–13 | | | 75–38 | Report |

== Knockout stage ==
=== Fifth place match ===
| 5th place |
| 8 July |
| Kenya | 3 |
| South Africa | 0 |

| Date | Time | | Score | | Set 1 | Set 2 | Set 3 | Set 4 | Set 5 | Total | Report |
|---|---|---|---|---|---|---|---|---|---|---|---|
| 8 July | 10:00 | Kenya | 3–0 | South Africa | 25–11 | 25–20 | 25–12 | | | 75–43 | Report |

=== Bracket ===
Semi finals
8 July
Egypt | 3
Algeria | 0
8 July
Rwanda | 3
Morocco | 0

Final
9 July
Egypt | 3
Rwanda | 0
Third place
9 July
Algeria | 3
Morocco | 0

=== Semi finals ===
| Date | Time | | Score | | Set 1 | Set 2 | Set 3 | Set 4 | Set 5 | Total | Report |
|---|---|---|---|---|---|---|---|---|---|---|---|
| 8 July | 17:00 | Egypt | 3–0 | Algeria | 25–18 | 25–12 | 25–16 | | | 75–46 | Report |
| 8 July | 19:00 | Rwanda | 3–0 | Morocco | 25–18 | 25–17 | 25–17 | | | 75–52 | Report |

=== Third place match ===
| Date | Time | | Score | | Set 1 | Set 2 | Set 3 | Set 4 | Set 5 | Total | Report |
|---|---|---|---|---|---|---|---|---|---|---|---|
| 9 July | 10:00 | Algeria | 3–0 | Morocco | 25–18 | 27–25 | 25–12 | | | 77–55 | Report |

=== Final ===
| Date | Time | | Score | | Set 1 | Set 2 | Set 3 | Set 4 | Set 5 | Total | Report |
|---|---|---|---|---|---|---|---|---|---|---|---|
| 9 July | 17:30 | Egypt | 3–0 | Rwanda | 25–21 | 25–13 | 25–20 | | | 75–54 | Report |

== Final rankings ==
By finishing in the top two, Egypt and Rwanda qualified for the world championship.

| Rank | Team |
|---|---|
| Gold medal | Egypt |
| Silver medal | Rwanda |
| Bronze medal | Algeria |
| 4 | Morocco |
| 5 | Kenya |
| 6 | South Africa |

| Team Qualified for the 2026 Sitting Volleyball World Championships |

== Aftermath ==
After hosting the championship, Kenya expressed interest in hosting a future world championship.

== See also ==
- 2025 African Sitting Volleyball Championships – Women's tournament
