= 2025 Pan American Sitting Volleyball Championships – Women's tournament =

Sitting volleyball tournament in United States

2025 Pan American Sitting Volleyball Championships

Tournament details
- Host country: United States
- City: Denver
- Dates: 24–27 May
- Teams: 3 (from 1 confederation)
- Venue: 1 (in 1 host city)

Final positions
- Champions: [[ women's sitting national volleyball team|]] (1st title)
- Runners-up: [[ women's sitting national volleyball team|]]
- Third place: [[ women's sitting national volleyball team|]]

Tournament statistics
- Matches played: 7
- Best blocker: (United States) Lora Webster
- Best setter: (United States) Kaleo Kanahele Maclay

The 2025 Pan American Sitting Volleyball Championships – Women's tournament is the 5th edition of the biannual continental championship, contested by the senior women's national sitting volleyball teams in the Americas region, sanctioned by ParaVolley Pan America. It was held in Denver, United States from 24 to 27 May 2025, marking the third time the event is held in the country.

Three teams took part, one more than the previous edition.

The tournament acted as qualification for the 2026 Sitting Volleyball World Championships in Hangzhou, China, with two spots available.

United States are the defending champions, after beating Canada 3–2 in a best of five series in the 2023 iteration in Edmonton, but they couldn't defend their title as they lost to Brazil in the final. Brazil won their first title after beating United States 3–0 in the final.

== Host selection ==
On 5 November 2024, Denver, United States were given the hosting rights. This was the third time the event was held in the United States, after 2009 and 2013. The event was organised alongside the 2025 USA Volleyball Open National Championship.

=== Quotes ===
“We’re pleased to hold the zonal championship in the United States. This is an excellent opportunity to showcase sitting volleyball to the U.S. audience as we look ahead to both teams competing at LA2028.”

— USA Volleyball president and CEO John Speraw.

“I’m thrilled that USA Volleyball has agreed to host the 2025 ParaVolley Pan America Sitting Volleyball Zonal Championships. This event is of great significance to the Pan America Zone, as it will provide the top two teams in each gender the opportunity to secure a spot in the 2026 World Championships. Equally important, every participating team will earn valuable World Ranking Points, further enhancing their standing on the global stage. We look forward to an exciting and competitive tournament.”

— Joe Campbell, president of ParaVolley Pan America.

== Teams ==
Three teams took part, one more than the previous edition. Teams arrived on 21 May and departed on 29 May. Brazil return after a one edition absence after their withdrawal in 2023.

Team	Appearance(s)					Previous best performance (Note: Bold text indicates they hosted that edition.)
Team	Total	First	Last	Streak	2023	Previous best performance
Brazil	4th	2010	2017	1	N/A	Runners-up (2010, 2013, 2017)
Canada	5th	2010	2023	5	2nd	Runners-up (2023)
United States (H)	5th	2010	2023	5	1st	Champions (2010, 2013, 2017, 2023)

== Squads ==
=== United States ===
Lora Webster (MB)
Bethany Zummo (L)
Lexi Patterson (S/L)
Monique Matthews (MB/OH)
Whitney Dosty (OH/OPP)
Tia Edwards (OH/MB)
Jillian Williams-Coffee (MB/OPP/OH)
Emma Schieck (OH)
Kaleo Kanahele Maclay (S)
Nicky Nieves (MB/OH)
Courtney Baker (OH)
MaKenzie Franklin (OH)
Raelene Elam (OH)

== Venue ==
The tournament was held at the Colorado Convention Center in Denver. The multi-purpose convention center was built in 1990 but expanded in 2004.

2025 Pan American Sitting Volleyball Championships – Women's tournament is located in the United States	Denver
2025 Pan American Sitting Volleyball Championships – Women's tournament is located in the United States	Colorado Convention Center
2025 Pan American Sitting Volleyball Championships – Women's tournament is located in the United States	Capacity: unknown

== Group stage ==
- The schedule was announced on 29 April 2025.
- All times are local.
- Match won 3–0 or 3–1: 3 match points for the winner, 0 match points for the loser
- Match won 3–2: 2 match points for the winner, 1 match point for the loser

=== Tiebreakers ===
1. Number of matches won
2. Match points
3. Sets ratio
4. Points ratio
5. If the tie continues as per the point ratio between two teams, the priority is given to the team which won the match between them. When the tie in points ratio is between three or more teams, a new classification of these teams in the terms of points 1, 2, 3 and 4 is made taking into consideration only the matches in which they were opposed to each other.

Pos	Team	Pld	W	L	Pts	SW	SL	SR	SPW	SPL	SPR	Qualification
1	United States (H)	4	4	0	11	12	3	4.000	354	276	1.283	Final
2	Brazil	4	2	2	7	9	6	1.500	333	300	1.110	Final
3	Canada	4	0	4	0	0	12	0.000	189	300	0.630	

Source: 2025 Pan American Sitting Volleyball Championships
(H) Host

Date	Time		Score		Set 1	Set 2	Set 3	Set 4	Set 5	Total	Report
24 May	10:00	United States	3–0	Canada	25–21	25–22	25–15			75–58	Report
24 May	17:00	Canada	0–3	Brazil	21–25	19–25	17–25			57–75	Report
25 May	10:00	United States	3–2	Brazil	25–17	25–17	24–26	23–25	15–11	112–96	Report
25 May	17:00	United States	3–0	Canada	25–9	25–15	25–11			75–35	Report
26 May	10:00	Canada	0–3	Brazil	10–25	13–25	16–25			39–75	Report
26 May	17:00	United States	3–1	Brazil	15–25	25–20	25–17	27–25		92–87	Report

== Final ==
Final
27 May
United States	0
Brazil	3

Date	Time		Score		Set 1	Set 2	Set 3	Set 4	Set 5	Total	Report
27 May	15:00	United States	0–3	Brazil	26–28	22–25	20–25			68–78	Report

== Final rankings ==
As winners of the 2024 Paralympics and 2028 Paralympic hosts, United States already qualified automatically, thereby the second world championship spot was given to Canada.

Rank	Team
Gold medal	Brazil
Silver medal	United States
Bronze medal	Canada

Team Qualified for the 2026 Sitting Volleyball World Championships

== See also ==
- 2025 Pan American Sitting Volleyball Championships – Men's tournament
