= 2026 Sitting Volleyball World Championships – Men's event =

Sitting volleyball tournament in China

2026 Sitting Volleyball World Championships
2026 年坐式排球世界锦标赛

Tournament details
- Host country: China
- City: Hangzhou
- Dates: 10–17 July
- Teams: 16 (from 4 confederations)
- Venue: 1 (in 1 host city)

Final positions
- Champions: Iran (9th title)
- Runners-up: Bosnia and Herzegovina
- Third place: Kazakhstan
- Fourth place: Brazil

The 2026 Sitting Volleyball World Championships – Men's event is the 14th edition of the quadrennial world championship, contested by the senior men's national sitting volleyball teams, sanctioned by World ParaVolley. It was held in Hangzhou, China from 10 to 17 July 2026, marking the first time the event is held in the country and the first time it was held in East Asia.

16 teams took part for the third time since the expansion in 2018. Hosts China automatically qualified as hosts. Qualification took place between May and November 2025, with continental, world tournaments and rankings being used as qualification. Thailand made their debut.

This was the first edition to implement video challenge system. On 11 July, the tournament was suspended for a day after Typhoon Bavi hit Hangzhou. Play commenced the next day with an updated schedule.

The winners secure a ticket to the 2028 Summer Paralympics.

Iran are the defending champions, after beating Bosnia and Herzegovina 3–0 in the 2022 final in Sarajevo.

== Host selection ==
After withdrawing from hosting the 2022 edition, Hangzhou was given the 2026 hosting rights instead. Hangzhou had already been stated as the host on the events section of the World ParaVolley website but it was made official in July 2025. This marks the first time the event is held in the country and the first and second time it will be held in East Asia and Asia respectively.

=== Quotes ===
“We sincerely appreciate WPV’s trust and support in entrusting us with hosting the 2026 WPV Sitting Volleyball World Championship! We will go all out, prepare with great care, and strive to present a wonderful and successful sports event!”

— Lu Cailiang, president of ParaVolley Asia-Oceania and director of the World ParaVolley Development Centre, Hangzhou.

“After an extensive dialogue with the local organizing committee we are extremely happy to announce the contract signature for the 2026 Sitting Volleyball World Championships for Women and Men. Hangzhou has already successfully hosted this year’s ParaVolley Asia-Oceania Zonal Championships. The Worlds will kick us off into the qualification race for the LA28 Paralympics – so we can expect thrilling matches for the global crown and for the first tickets to LA28 to be awarded.”

— Juergen Schrapp, President of World ParaVolley.

“I am excited that the 2026 World Championships will be held in Hangzhou, China. It’s the first time the World Championships have been held in Asia, the first of our LA28 qualification events, and the first time that the challenge system will be used at this level of event. It is a great facility, so we expect some spectacular matches between our teams that have already been qualifying via their 2025 Zonal Championships.

— Stephen Giugni, Sport Director of World ParaVolley.

== Preparations ==
- On 29 July 2025, the host contract was signed.
- On 7 July 2026, the official website went live.

=== Opening ceremony ===
On 9 July 2026, a day before the competition started, the opening ceremony took place. The opening ceremony consisted of dances where the performers wore traditional costumes. Live piano and violins were also played. As tradition, the parade of nations took place.

==== Quotes ====
"The preparation for these championships has been outstanding. Together, we are delivering one of the most technologically advanced World ParaVolley events ever staged, featuring comprehensive video challenge coverage, enhanced broadcast and streaming production, and expanded digital and social media engagement that will allow fans around the world to experience our sport like never before"

— Juergen Schrapp, World ParaVolley president

== Qualification ==
=== Slot allocation ===
- Host nation: 1
- 2024 Summer Paralympics champions: 1
- 2028 Summer Paralympics hosts: 1
- ParaVolley Asia Oceania: 2
- ParaVolley Africa: 2
- ParaVolley Americas: 2
- ParaVolley Europe: 3
- 2025 World Cup: 2
- World rankings: 2

16 teams will take part for the third time since the expansion in 2018. Hosts China automatically qualified as hosts. Qualification took place between May and November 2025, with continental, world tournaments and rankings being used as qualification. A total of 32 countries took part in qualification, excluding Iraq who qualified despite not taking part in a qualifier.

Of the qualified teams, 14 took part in 2022. Thailand will make their debut, marking the first time a team from Southeast Asia qualified. Hosts, China return after missing out on 2022 due to Covid.

Of the absentees, two-time champions, Netherlands, the only team to have taken part in every edition, missed out for the first time ever. Serbia missed out after their sporadic appearance in 2022. Similar to 2022, Russia was banned from taking part in qualification.

For the first time, Canada qualified for the second successive time. For the first time ever, Europe doesn't have the most teams at the championship, as Asia and Oceania have six teams taking part compared to Europe's five.

The highest ranked team to not qualify was 2024 Paralympic Games hosts, France, ranked 15th, while the lowest ranked team to qualify was Thailand, placed 20th.

=== Qualified teams ===
Qualification	Host	Dates	Vacancies	Qualified
Host nation	(China) Hangzhou	29 July 2025	1	China
2024 Summer Paralympics winners	(France) Paris	29 August – 7 September 2024	1	Iran
2028 Summer Paralympics hosts	(Peru) Lima	13 September 2017	1	United States
2025 Pan American Championships	(United States) Denver	24–28 May 2025	2	Brazil; Canada
2025 Asia and Oceania Championships	(China) Hangzhou	9–14 June 2025	2	Kazakhstan; Thailand
2025 African Championships	(Kenya) Nairobi	4–9 July 2025	2	Egypt; Rwanda
2025 European Championships	(Hungary) Győr	28 July – 2 August 2025	3	Bosnia and Herzegovina; Germany; Ukraine
2025 World Cup	(United States) Fort Wayne	12–18 October 2025	2	Poland; Croatia
World rankings		12 November 2025	2	Japan; Iraq

=== World rankings ===
The final 2 places belonged to the top 2 teams as per the sitting volleyball world rankings who had not yet qualified as of 12 November 2025.

==== Top 20 in world rankings ====
Qualified for the 2026 Sitting Volleyball World Championships
Qualified for the 2026 Sitting Volleyball World Championships via World Ranking

Rank	Team	Points
1	Egypt	4,714
2	Brazil	4,297
3	Bosnia and Herzegovina	4,150
4	Iran	4,000
5	Kazakhstan	3,872
6	United States	3,379
7	Germany	3,343
8	Canada	2,628
9	Ukraine	2,594
10	Croatia	2,342
11	Poland	2,253
12	Japan	1,966
13	Iraq	1,643
14	China	1,632
15	France	1,487
16	Rwanda	1,282
17	Netherlands	1,059
18	Serbia	980
19	Morocco	815
20	Thailand	794

=== Summary of qualified teams ===
Team	Qualification method	Date of qualification	Appearance(s)				Previous best performance (Note: Bold text indicates they hosted that edition.)	WR
Team	Qualification method	Date of qualification	Total	First	Last	Streak	Previous best performance	WR
China	Host nation	6 February 2025	5th	2006	2018	5	Sixth place (2006)	14
Iran	2024 Summer Paralympics winners	6 February 2025	12th	1985	2022	10	Champions (Eight times) (Note: Iran have won in 1985, 1986, 1990, 1994, 1998, 2010, 2018 and 2022.)	4
United States	2028 Summer Paralympics hosts	6 February 2025	9th	1986	2022	7	Eighth place (2018, 2022)	6
Brazil	2025 Pan American Championships	27 May 2025	5th	2006	2022	5	Runners-up (2014)	2
Canada	2025 Pan American Championships	28 May 2025	3rd	2010	2022	2	Eleventh place (2022)	8
Kazakhstan	2025 Asia and Oceania Championships	13 June 2025	5th	1998	2022	3	Fifth place (2022)	5
Thailand	2025 Asia and Oceania Championships	14 June 2025	1st	Debut				20
Egypt	2025 African Championships	8 July 2025	9th	1986	2022	8	Third place (2006, 2010)	1
Rwanda	2025 African Championships	8 July 2025	4th	2010	2022	3	Thirteenth place (2022)	16
Bosnia and Herzegovina	2025 European Championships	1 August 2025	8th	1998	2022	8	Champions (2002, 2006, 2014)	3
Germany	2025 European Championships	1 August 2025	14th	1983	2022	14	Runners-up (1983, 2002)	7
Ukraine	2025 European Championships	2 August 2025	5th	2010	2022	5	Fourth place (2018)	9
Poland	2025 World Cup	17 October 2025	4th	2014	2022	4	Twelfth place (2014, 2018, 2022)	11
Croatia	2025 World Cup	18 October 2025	6th	2006	2022	6	Seventh place (2006)	10
Japan	World rankings	12 November 2025	6th	1998	2022	3	Eighth place (2002)	12
Iraq	World rankings	12 November 2025	6th	1990	2022	2	Sixth place (1990, 2002)	13

== Composition of teams ==
On 15 March 2026, the pools were announced. The groups were decided via the Serpentine system. As hosts, China is seeded into position 1.

Pool A
Seed	WR	Team
1	14	China (H)
8	7	Germany
9	8	Canada
16	20	Thailand

Pool B
Seed	WR	Team
2	1	Egypt
7	6	United States
10	10	Ukraine
15	15	Rwanda

Pool C
Seed	WR	Team
3	2	Brazil
6	5	Kazakhstan
11	10	Croatia
14	13	Iraq

Pool D
Seed	WR	Team
4	3	Bosnia and Herzegovina
5	4	Iran
12	11	Poland
13	12	Japan

=== Schedule ===
The schedule was announced on 17 June. Due to Typhoon Bavi, the schedule was later adjusted.

Schedule
Round	Matchday	Date
Preliminary round	All matches	10–13 July 2026
Knockout stage	Round of 16	14 July 2026
Knockout stage	Quarterfinals	15 July 2026
Knockout stage	Semifinals	16 July 2026
Knockout stage	3rd place & Final	17 July 2026

Original schedule
Round	Matchday	Date
Preliminary round	All matches	10–12 July 2026
Knockout stage	Round of 16	13 July 2026
Knockout stage	Quarterfinals	14 July 2026
Knockout stage	Semifinals	15 July 2026
Knockout stage	Third place	16 July 2026
Final	17 July 2026	

== Venue ==
The World ParaVolley Development Centre in Hangzhou was the venue. The venue hosted the 2017 and 2025 Asia and Oceania Sitting Volleyball Championships, plus the 2017 World ParaVolley Women's Super 6. The venue has also hosted numerous other events in other Paralympic sports. Three courts were used during the event.

2026 Sitting Volleyball World Championships – Men's event is located in China	Hangzhou
2026 Sitting Volleyball World Championships – Men's event is located in China	World ParaVolley Development Centre
2026 Sitting Volleyball World Championships – Men's event is located in China	Capacity: Unknown

== Format ==
16 teams are split into four groups of four, where every team advances to the Round of 16. In the Round of 16, teams who finished 1st play the teams that finished fourth, and the teams who finished 2nd play the teams that finished third. The eight winners advance to the Quarter Finals, while the eight losers play in a 9–16 classification bracket.

== Group stage ==
- All times are local.
- The top four teams in each pool qualify for the final round.
- Match won 3–0 or 3–1: 3 match points for the winner, 0 match points for the loser
- Match won 3–2: 2 match points for the winner, 1 match point for the loser

=== Tiebreakers ===
1. Number of matches won
2. Match points
3. Sets ratio
4. Points ratio
5. If the tie continues as per the point ratio between two teams, the priority is given to the team which won the match between them. When the tie in points ratio is between three or more teams, a new classification of these teams in the terms of points 1, 2, 3 and 4 is made taking into consideration only the matches in which they were opposed to each other.

=== Pool A ===
Pos	Team	Pld	W	L	Pts	SW	SL	SR	SPW	SPL	SPR
1	China (H)	0	0	0	0	0	0	—	0	0	—
2	Germany	0	0	0	0	0	0	—	0	0	—
3	Canada	0	0	0	0	0	0	—	0	0	—
4	Thailand	0	0	0	0	0	0	—	0	0	—

Source: 2026 Sitting Volleyball World Championships
(H) Host

10 July 2026	N/A	–	N/A	World ParaVolley Development Centre, Hangzhou
10 July 2026	(–, –, –, –, –) [ Report] [ PDF]			World ParaVolley Development Centre, Hangzhou
10 July 2026	Scoring leaders			World ParaVolley Development Centre, Hangzhou
(0/0)		Attack	(0/0)
(0/0)		Serve	(0/0)

10 July 2026	N/A	–	N/A	World ParaVolley Development Centre, Hangzhou
10 July 2026	(–, –, –, –, –) [ Report] [ PDF]			World ParaVolley Development Centre, Hangzhou
10 July 2026	Scoring leaders			World ParaVolley Development Centre, Hangzhou
(0/0)		Attack	(0/0)
(0/0)		Serve	(0/0)

12 July 2026	N/A	–	N/A	World ParaVolley Development Centre, Hangzhou
12 July 2026	(–, –, –, –, –) [ Report] [ PDF]			World ParaVolley Development Centre, Hangzhou
12 July 2026	Scoring leaders			World ParaVolley Development Centre, Hangzhou
(0/0)		Attack	(0/0)
(0/0)		Serve	(0/0)

12 July 2026	N/A	–	N/A	World ParaVolley Development Centre, Hangzhou
12 July 2026	(–, –, –, –, –) [ Report] [ PDF]			World ParaVolley Development Centre, Hangzhou
12 July 2026	Scoring leaders			World ParaVolley Development Centre, Hangzhou
(0/0)		Attack	(0/0)
(0/0)		Serve	(0/0)

13 July 2026	N/A	–	N/A	World ParaVolley Development Centre, Hangzhou
13 July 2026	(–, –, –, –, –) [ Report] [ PDF]			World ParaVolley Development Centre, Hangzhou
13 July 2026	Scoring leaders			World ParaVolley Development Centre, Hangzhou
(0/0)		Attack	(0/0)
(0/0)		Serve	(0/0)

13 July 2026	N/A	–	N/A	World ParaVolley Development Centre, Hangzhou
13 July 2026	(–, –, –, –, –) [ Report] [ PDF]			World ParaVolley Development Centre, Hangzhou
13 July 2026	Scoring leaders			World ParaVolley Development Centre, Hangzhou
(0/0)		Attack	(0/0)
(0/0)		Serve	(0/0)

=== Pool B ===
Pos	Team	Pld	W	L	Pts	SW	SL	SR	SPW	SPL	SPR
1	Egypt	0	0	0	0	0	0	—	0	0	—
2	United States	0	0	0	0	0	0	—	0	0	—
3	Ukraine	0	0	0	0	0	0	—	0	0	—
4	Rwanda	0	0	0	0	0	0	—	0	0	—

Source: 2026 Sitting Volleyball World Championships

10 July 2026	N/A	–	N/A	World ParaVolley Development Centre, Hangzhou
10 July 2026	(–, –, –, –, –) [ Report] [ PDF]			World ParaVolley Development Centre, Hangzhou
10 July 2026	Scoring leaders			World ParaVolley Development Centre, Hangzhou
(0/0)		Attack	(0/0)
(0/0)		Serve	(0/0)

10 July 2026	N/A	–	N/A	World ParaVolley Development Centre, Hangzhou
10 July 2026	(–, –, –, –, –) [ Report] [ PDF]			World ParaVolley Development Centre, Hangzhou
10 July 2026	Scoring leaders			World ParaVolley Development Centre, Hangzhou
(0/0)		Attack	(0/0)
(0/0)		Serve	(0/0)

12 July 2026	N/A	–	N/A	World ParaVolley Development Centre, Hangzhou
12 July 2026	(–, –, –, –, –) [ Report] [ PDF]			World ParaVolley Development Centre, Hangzhou
12 July 2026	Scoring leaders			World ParaVolley Development Centre, Hangzhou
(0/0)		Attack	(0/0)
(0/0)		Serve	(0/0)

12 July 2026	N/A	–	N/A	World ParaVolley Development Centre, Hangzhou
12 July 2026	(–, –, –, –, –) [ Report] [ PDF]			World ParaVolley Development Centre, Hangzhou
12 July 2026	Scoring leaders			World ParaVolley Development Centre, Hangzhou
(0/0)		Attack	(0/0)
(0/0)		Serve	(0/0)

13 July 2026	N/A	–	N/A	World ParaVolley Development Centre, Hangzhou
13 July 2026	(–, –, –, –, –) [ Report] [ PDF]			World ParaVolley Development Centre, Hangzhou
13 July 2026	Scoring leaders			World ParaVolley Development Centre, Hangzhou
(0/0)		Attack	(0/0)
(0/0)		Serve	(0/0)

13 July 2026	N/A	–	N/A	World ParaVolley Development Centre, Hangzhou
13 July 2026	(–, –, –, –, –) [ Report] [ PDF]			World ParaVolley Development Centre, Hangzhou
13 July 2026	Scoring leaders			World ParaVolley Development Centre, Hangzhou
(0/0)		Attack	(0/0)
(0/0)		Serve	(0/0)

=== Pool C ===
Pos	Team	Pld	W	L	Pts	SW	SL	SR	SPW	SPL	SPR
1	Brazil	0	0	0	0	0	0	—	0	0	—
2	Kazakhstan	0	0	0	0	0	0	—	0	0	—
3	Croatia	0	0	0	0	0	0	—	0	0	—
4	Iraq	0	0	0	0	0	0	—	0	0	—

Source: 2026 Sitting Volleyball World Championships

10 July 2026	N/A	–	N/A	World ParaVolley Development Centre, Hangzhou
10 July 2026	(–, –, –, –, –) [ Report] [ PDF]			World ParaVolley Development Centre, Hangzhou
10 July 2026	Scoring leaders			World ParaVolley Development Centre, Hangzhou
(0/0)		Attack	(0/0)
(0/0)		Serve	(0/0)

10 July 2026	N/A	–	N/A	World ParaVolley Development Centre, Hangzhou
10 July 2026	(–, –, –, –, –) [ Report] [ PDF]			World ParaVolley Development Centre, Hangzhou
10 July 2026	Scoring leaders			World ParaVolley Development Centre, Hangzhou
(0/0)		Attack	(0/0)
(0/0)		Serve	(0/0)

11 July 2026	N/A	–	N/A	World ParaVolley Development Centre, Hangzhou
11 July 2026	(–, –, –, –, –) [ Report] [ PDF]			World ParaVolley Development Centre, Hangzhou
11 July 2026	Scoring leaders			World ParaVolley Development Centre, Hangzhou
(0/0)		Attack	(0/0)
(0/0)		Serve	(0/0)

12 July 2026	N/A	–	N/A	World ParaVolley Development Centre, Hangzhou
12 July 2026	(–, –, –, –, –) [ Report] [ PDF]			World ParaVolley Development Centre, Hangzhou
12 July 2026	Scoring leaders			World ParaVolley Development Centre, Hangzhou
(0/0)		Attack	(0/0)
(0/0)		Serve	(0/0)

13 July 2026	N/A	–	N/A	World ParaVolley Development Centre, Hangzhou
13 July 2026	(–, –, –, –, –) [ Report] [ PDF]			World ParaVolley Development Centre, Hangzhou
13 July 2026	Scoring leaders			World ParaVolley Development Centre, Hangzhou
(0/0)		Attack	(0/0)
(0/0)		Serve	(0/0)

13 July 2026	N/A	–	N/A	World ParaVolley Development Centre, Hangzhou
13 July 2026	(–, –, –, –, –) [ Report] [ PDF]			World ParaVolley Development Centre, Hangzhou
13 July 2026	Scoring leaders			World ParaVolley Development Centre, Hangzhou
(0/0)		Attack	(0/0)
(0/0)		Serve	(0/0)

=== Pool D ===
Pos	Team	Pld	W	L	Pts	SW	SL	SR	SPW	SPL	SPR
1	Bosnia and Herzegovina	0	0	0	0	0	0	—	0	0	—
2	Iran	0	0	0	0	0	0	—	0	0	—
3	Poland	0	0	0	0	0	0	—	0	0	—
4	Japan	0	0	0	0	0	0	—	0	0	—

Source: 2026 Sitting Volleyball World Championships

10 July 2026	N/A	–	N/A	World ParaVolley Development Centre, Hangzhou
10 July 2026	(–, –, –, –, –) [ Report] [ PDF]			World ParaVolley Development Centre, Hangzhou
10 July 2026	Scoring leaders			World ParaVolley Development Centre, Hangzhou
(0/0)		Attack	(0/0)
(0/0)		Serve	(0/0)

10 July 2026	N/A	–	N/A	World ParaVolley Development Centre, Hangzhou
10 July 2026	(–, –, –, –, –) [ Report] [ PDF]			World ParaVolley Development Centre, Hangzhou
10 July 2026	Scoring leaders			World ParaVolley Development Centre, Hangzhou
(0/0)		Attack	(0/0)
(0/0)		Serve	(0/0)

12 July 2026	N/A	–	N/A	World ParaVolley Development Centre, Hangzhou
12 July 2026	(–, –, –, –, –) [ Report] [ PDF]			World ParaVolley Development Centre, Hangzhou
12 July 2026	Scoring leaders			World ParaVolley Development Centre, Hangzhou
(0/0)		Attack	(0/0)
(0/0)		Serve	(0/0)

12 July 2026	N/A	–	N/A	World ParaVolley Development Centre, Hangzhou
12 July 2026	(–, –, –, –, –) [ Report] [ PDF]			World ParaVolley Development Centre, Hangzhou
12 July 2026	Scoring leaders			World ParaVolley Development Centre, Hangzhou
(0/0)		Attack	(0/0)
(0/0)		Serve	(0/0)

13 July 2026	N/A	–	N/A	World ParaVolley Development Centre, Hangzhou
13 July 2026	(–, –, –, –, –) [ Report] [ PDF]			World ParaVolley Development Centre, Hangzhou
13 July 2026	Scoring leaders			World ParaVolley Development Centre, Hangzhou
(0/0)		Attack	(0/0)
(0/0)		Serve	(0/0)

13 July 2026	N/A	–	N/A	World ParaVolley Development Centre, Hangzhou
13 July 2026	(–, –, –, –, –) [ Report] [ PDF]			World ParaVolley Development Centre, Hangzhou
13 July 2026	Scoring leaders			World ParaVolley Development Centre, Hangzhou
(0/0)		Attack	(0/0)
(0/0)		Serve	(0/0)

== Knockout stage ==
=== Bracket ===
Round of 16
14 July
Kazakhstan	3
Poland	0
14 July
China	2
Rwanda	3
14 July
Iran	3
Croatia	0
14 July
United States	3
Canada	0
14 July
Germany	3
Ukraine	0
14 July
Brazil	3
Japan	0
14 July
Egypt	3
Thailand	0
14 July
Bosnia and Herzegovina	3
Iraq	1

Quarterfinals
15 July
Rwanda	0
Kazakhstan	3
15 July
Iran	3
United States	0
15 July
Brazil	3
Germany	1
15 July
Egypt	0
Bosnia and Herzegovina	3

Semifinals
16 July
Kazakhstan	0
Iran	3
16 July
Brazil	1
Bosnia and Herzegovina	3

Final
17 July
Iran	3
Bosnia and Herzegovina	1
Third place game
17 July
Kazakhstan	3
Brazil	2

=== Round of 16 ===
14 July 2026	N/A	–	N/A	World ParaVolley Development Centre, Hangzhou
14 July 2026	(–, –, –, –, –) [ Report] [ PDF]			World ParaVolley Development Centre, Hangzhou
14 July 2026	Scoring leaders			World ParaVolley Development Centre, Hangzhou
(0/0)		Attack	(0/0)
(0/0)		Serve	(0/0)

14 July 2026	N/A	–	N/A	World ParaVolley Development Centre, Hangzhou
14 July 2026	(–, –, –, –, –) [ Report] [ PDF]			World ParaVolley Development Centre, Hangzhou
14 July 2026	Scoring leaders			World ParaVolley Development Centre, Hangzhou
(0/0)		Attack	(0/0)
(0/0)		Serve	(0/0)

14 July 2026	N/A	–	N/A	World ParaVolley Development Centre, Hangzhou
14 July 2026	(–, –, –, –, –) [ Report] [ PDF]			World ParaVolley Development Centre, Hangzhou
14 July 2026	Scoring leaders			World ParaVolley Development Centre, Hangzhou
(0/0)		Attack	(0/0)
(0/0)		Serve	(0/0)

14 July 2026	N/A	–	N/A	World ParaVolley Development Centre, Hangzhou
14 July 2026	(–, –, –, –, –) [ Report] [ PDF]			World ParaVolley Development Centre, Hangzhou
14 July 2026	Scoring leaders			World ParaVolley Development Centre, Hangzhou
(0/0)		Attack	(0/0)
(0/0)		Serve	(0/0)

14 July 2026	N/A	–	N/A	World ParaVolley Development Centre, Hangzhou
14 July 2026	(–, –, –, –, –) [ Report] [ PDF]			World ParaVolley Development Centre, Hangzhou
14 July 2026	Scoring leaders			World ParaVolley Development Centre, Hangzhou
(0/0)		Attack	(0/0)
(0/0)		Serve	(0/0)

14 July 2026	N/A	–	N/A	World ParaVolley Development Centre, Hangzhou
14 July 2026	(–, –, –, –, –) [ Report] [ PDF]			World ParaVolley Development Centre, Hangzhou
14 July 2026	Scoring leaders			World ParaVolley Development Centre, Hangzhou
(0/0)		Attack	(0/0)
(0/0)		Serve	(0/0)

14 July 2026	N/A	–	N/A	World ParaVolley Development Centre, Hangzhou
14 July 2026	(–, –, –, –, –) [ Report] [ PDF]			World ParaVolley Development Centre, Hangzhou
14 July 2026	Scoring leaders			World ParaVolley Development Centre, Hangzhou
(0/0)		Attack	(0/0)
(0/0)		Serve	(0/0)

14 July 2026	N/A	–	N/A	World ParaVolley Development Centre, Hangzhou
14 July 2026	(–, –, –, –, –) [ Report] [ PDF]			World ParaVolley Development Centre, Hangzhou
14 July 2026	Scoring leaders			World ParaVolley Development Centre, Hangzhou
(0/0)		Attack	(0/0)
(0/0)		Serve	(0/0)

=== Quarterfinals ===
15 July 2026	N/A	–	N/A	World ParaVolley Development Centre, Hangzhou
15 July 2026	(–, –, –, –, –) [ Report] [ PDF]			World ParaVolley Development Centre, Hangzhou
15 July 2026	Scoring leaders			World ParaVolley Development Centre, Hangzhou
(0/0)		Attack	(0/0)
(0/0)		Serve	(0/0)

15 July 2026	N/A	–	N/A	World ParaVolley Development Centre, Hangzhou
15 July 2026	(–, –, –, –, –) [ Report] [ PDF]			World ParaVolley Development Centre, Hangzhou
15 July 2026	Scoring leaders			World ParaVolley Development Centre, Hangzhou
(0/0)		Attack	(0/0)
(0/0)		Serve	(0/0)

15 July 2026	N/A	–	N/A	World ParaVolley Development Centre, Hangzhou
15 July 2026	(–, –, –, –, –) [ Report] [ PDF]			World ParaVolley Development Centre, Hangzhou
15 July 2026	Scoring leaders			World ParaVolley Development Centre, Hangzhou
(0/0)		Attack	(0/0)
(0/0)		Serve	(0/0)

15 July 2026	N/A	–	N/A	World ParaVolley Development Centre, Hangzhou
15 July 2026	(–, –, –, –, –) [ Report] [ PDF]			World ParaVolley Development Centre, Hangzhou
15 July 2026	Scoring leaders			World ParaVolley Development Centre, Hangzhou
(0/0)		Attack	(0/0)
(0/0)		Serve	(0/0)

=== Semifinals ===
16 July 2026	N/A	–	N/A	World ParaVolley Development Centre, Hangzhou
16 July 2026	(–, –, –, –, –) [ Report] [ PDF]			World ParaVolley Development Centre, Hangzhou
16 July 2026	Scoring leaders			World ParaVolley Development Centre, Hangzhou
(0/0)		Attack	(0/0)
(0/0)		Serve	(0/0)

16 July 2026	N/A	–	N/A	World ParaVolley Development Centre, Hangzhou
16 July 2026	(–, –, –, –, –) [ Report] [ PDF]			World ParaVolley Development Centre, Hangzhou
16 July 2026	Scoring leaders			World ParaVolley Development Centre, Hangzhou
(0/0)		Attack	(0/0)
(0/0)		Serve	(0/0)

=== Third place game ===
17 July 2026	N/A	–	N/A	World ParaVolley Development Centre, Hangzhou
17 July 2026	(–, –, –, –, –) [ Report] [ PDF]			World ParaVolley Development Centre, Hangzhou
17 July 2026	Scoring leaders			World ParaVolley Development Centre, Hangzhou
(0/0)		Attack	(0/0)
(0/0)		Serve	(0/0)

=== Final ===
17 July 2026	N/A	–	N/A	World ParaVolley Development Centre, Hangzhou
17 July 2026	(–, –, –, –, –) [ Report] [ PDF]			World ParaVolley Development Centre, Hangzhou
17 July 2026	Scoring leaders			World ParaVolley Development Centre, Hangzhou
(0/0)		Attack	(0/0)
(0/0)		Serve	(0/0)

=== Classification rounds ===
==== 5–8th place bracket ====
5–8th place semifinals
16 July
Rwanda	1
United States	3
16 July
Germany	3
Egypt	1

Fifth place game
17 July
United States	3
Germany	2
Seventh place game
17 July
Rwanda	0
Egypt	3

=== 5–8th place semifinals ===
16 July 2026	N/A	–	N/A	World ParaVolley Development Centre, Hangzhou
16 July 2026	(–, –, –, –, –) [ Report] [ PDF]			World ParaVolley Development Centre, Hangzhou
16 July 2026	Scoring leaders			World ParaVolley Development Centre, Hangzhou
(0/0)		Attack	(0/0)
(0/0)		Serve	(0/0)

16 July 2026	N/A	–	N/A	World ParaVolley Development Centre, Hangzhou
16 July 2026	(–, –, –, –, –) [ Report] [ PDF]			World ParaVolley Development Centre, Hangzhou
16 July 2026	Scoring leaders			World ParaVolley Development Centre, Hangzhou
(0/0)		Attack	(0/0)
(0/0)		Serve	(0/0)

=== Seventh place game ===
17 July 2026	N/A	–	N/A	World ParaVolley Development Centre, Hangzhou
17 July 2026	(–, –, –, –, –) [ Report] [ PDF]			World ParaVolley Development Centre, Hangzhou
17 July 2026	Scoring leaders			World ParaVolley Development Centre, Hangzhou
(0/0)		Attack	(0/0)
(0/0)		Serve	(0/0)

=== Fifth place game ===
17 July 2026	N/A	–	N/A	World ParaVolley Development Centre, Hangzhou
17 July 2026	(–, –, –, –, –) [ Report] [ PDF]			World ParaVolley Development Centre, Hangzhou
17 July 2026	Scoring leaders			World ParaVolley Development Centre, Hangzhou
(0/0)		Attack	(0/0)
(0/0)		Serve	(0/0)

==== 9–16th place bracket ====
9–16th place quarterfinals
15 July
China	0
Poland	3
15 July
Croatia	3
Canada	0
15 July
Japan	0
Ukraine	3
15 July
Thailand	1
Iraq	3

9–12th place semifinals
16 July
Poland	3
Croatia	1
16 July
Ukraine	3
Iraq	1

Ninth place game
17 July
Poland	0
Ukraine	3
Eleventh place game
17 July
Croatia	3
Iraq	1

=== 9–16th place quarterfinals ===
15 July 2026	N/A	–	N/A	World ParaVolley Development Centre, Hangzhou
15 July 2026	(–, –, –, –, –) [ Report] [ PDF]			World ParaVolley Development Centre, Hangzhou
15 July 2026	Scoring leaders			World ParaVolley Development Centre, Hangzhou
(0/0)		Attack	(0/0)
(0/0)		Serve	(0/0)

15 July 2026	N/A	–	N/A	World ParaVolley Development Centre, Hangzhou
15 July 2026	(–, –, –, –, –) [ Report] [ PDF]			World ParaVolley Development Centre, Hangzhou
15 July 2026	Scoring leaders			World ParaVolley Development Centre, Hangzhou
(0/0)		Attack	(0/0)
(0/0)		Serve	(0/0)

15 July 2026	N/A	–	N/A	World ParaVolley Development Centre, Hangzhou
15 July 2026	(–, –, –, –, –) [ Report] [ PDF]			World ParaVolley Development Centre, Hangzhou
15 July 2026	Scoring leaders			World ParaVolley Development Centre, Hangzhou
(0/0)		Attack	(0/0)
(0/0)		Serve	(0/0)

15 July 2026	N/A	–	N/A	World ParaVolley Development Centre, Hangzhou
15 July 2026	(–, –, –, –, –) [ Report] [ PDF]			World ParaVolley Development Centre, Hangzhou
15 July 2026	Scoring leaders			World ParaVolley Development Centre, Hangzhou
(0/0)		Attack	(0/0)
(0/0)		Serve	(0/0)

=== 9–12th place semifinals ===
16 July 2026	N/A	–	N/A	World ParaVolley Development Centre, Hangzhou
16 July 2026	(–, –, –, –, –) [ Report] [ PDF]			World ParaVolley Development Centre, Hangzhou
16 July 2026	Scoring leaders			World ParaVolley Development Centre, Hangzhou
(0/0)		Attack	(0/0)
(0/0)		Serve	(0/0)

16 July 2026	N/A	–	N/A	World ParaVolley Development Centre, Hangzhou
16 July 2026	(–, –, –, –, –) [ Report] [ PDF]			World ParaVolley Development Centre, Hangzhou
16 July 2026	Scoring leaders			World ParaVolley Development Centre, Hangzhou
(0/0)		Attack	(0/0)
(0/0)		Serve	(0/0)

=== Eleventh place game ===
17 July 2026	N/A	–	N/A	World ParaVolley Development Centre, Hangzhou
17 July 2026	(–, –, –, –, –) [ Report] [ PDF]			World ParaVolley Development Centre, Hangzhou
17 July 2026	Scoring leaders			World ParaVolley Development Centre, Hangzhou
(0/0)		Attack	(0/0)
(0/0)		Serve	(0/0)

=== Ninth place game ===
17 July 2026	N/A	–	N/A	World ParaVolley Development Centre, Hangzhou
17 July 2026	(–, –, –, –, –) [ Report] [ PDF]			World ParaVolley Development Centre, Hangzhou
17 July 2026	Scoring leaders			World ParaVolley Development Centre, Hangzhou
(0/0)		Attack	(0/0)
(0/0)		Serve	(0/0)

==== 13–16th place bracket ====
13–16th place semifinals
16 July
China	3
Canada	2
16 July
Japan	2
Thailand	3

13th place game
16 July
China	3
Thailand	2
15th place game
16 July
Canada	3
Japan	0

=== 13–16th place semifinals ===
16 July 2026	N/A	–	N/A	World ParaVolley Development Centre, Hangzhou
16 July 2026	(–, –, –, –, –) [ Report] [ PDF]			World ParaVolley Development Centre, Hangzhou
16 July 2026	Scoring leaders			World ParaVolley Development Centre, Hangzhou
(0/0)		Attack	(0/0)
(0/0)		Serve	(0/0)

16 July 2026	N/A	–	N/A	World ParaVolley Development Centre, Hangzhou
16 July 2026	(–, –, –, –, –) [ Report] [ PDF]			World ParaVolley Development Centre, Hangzhou
16 July 2026	Scoring leaders			World ParaVolley Development Centre, Hangzhou
(0/0)		Attack	(0/0)
(0/0)		Serve	(0/0)

=== 15th place game ===
16 July 2026	N/A	–	N/A	World ParaVolley Development Centre, Hangzhou
16 July 2026	(–, –, –, –, –) [ Report] [ PDF]			World ParaVolley Development Centre, Hangzhou
16 July 2026	Scoring leaders			World ParaVolley Development Centre, Hangzhou
(0/0)		Attack	(0/0)
(0/0)		Serve	(0/0)

=== 13th place game ===
16 July 2026	N/A	–	N/A	World ParaVolley Development Centre, Hangzhou
16 July 2026	(–, –, –, –, –) [ Report] [ PDF]			World ParaVolley Development Centre, Hangzhou
16 July 2026	Scoring leaders			World ParaVolley Development Centre, Hangzhou
(0/0)		Attack	(0/0)
(0/0)		Serve	(0/0)

== Final standings ==
=== Rankings table ===
Pos	Team	Pld	W	L	Pts	SW	SL	SR	SPW	SPL	SPR	Final result
1	TBD	0	0	0	0	0	0	—	0	0	—	Champions
2	TBD	0	0	0	0	0	0	—	0	0	—	Runners-up
3	TBD	0	0	0	0	0	0	—	0	0	—	Third place
4	TBD	0	0	0	0	0	0	—	0	0	—	Fourth place
5	TBD	0	0	0	0	0	0	—	0	0	—	Fifth place game
6	TBD	0	0	0	0	0	0	—	0	0	—	Fifth place game
7	TBD	0	0	0	0	0	0	—	0	0	—	Seventh place game
8	TBD	0	0	0	0	0	0	—	0	0	—	Seventh place game
9	TBD	0	0	0	0	0	0	—	0	0	—	Ninth place game
10	TBD	0	0	0	0	0	0	—	0	0	—	Ninth place game
11	TBD	0	0	0	0	0	0	—	0	0	—	Eleventh place game
12	TBD	0	0	0	0	0	0	—	0	0	—	Eleventh place game
13	TBD	0	0	0	0	0	0	—	0	0	—	Thirteenth place game
14	TBD	0	0	0	0	0	0	—	0	0	—	Thirteenth place game
15	TBD	0	0	0	0	0	0	—	0	0	—	Fifteenth place game
16	TBD	0	0	0	0	0	0	—	0	0	—	Fifteenth place game

Source: 2026 Sitting Volleyball World Championships
Rules for classification: 1) points; 2) head-to-head points; 3) head-to-head goal difference; 4) head-to-head number of goals scored; 5) Goal difference.

=== Qualification table ===
Rank	Team
1st place, gold medalist(s)	Iran
2nd place, silver medalist(s)	Bosnia and Herzegovina
3rd place, bronze medalist(s)	Kazakhstan
4	Brazil
5	United States
6	Germany
7	Egypt
8	Rwanda
9	Ukraine
10	Poland
11	Croatia
12	Iraq
13	China
14	Thailand
15	Canada
16	Japan

Qualified for the 2028 Summer Paralympics

2026 Sitting Volleyball World Championships

Iran
9th title

Team roster: Players.
Head Coach: Coach

== See also ==
- 2026 Sitting Volleyball World Championships – Women's event
