= 2025 Sitting Volleyball World Cup – Men's event =

Sitting volleyball tournament in United States

2025 Sitting Volleyball World Cup

Tournament details
- Host country: United States
- City: Fort Wayne
- Dates: 12–18 October
- Teams: 14 (from 4 confederations)
- Venue: 1 (in 1 host city)

Final positions
- Champions: Egypt (1st title)
- Runners-up: Brazil
- Third place: Kazakhstan
- Fourth place: United States

Tournament awards
- MVP: (Egypt) Hesham El Shwikh
- Best Setter: (Brazil) Gizele Dias
- Best Libero: (Brazil) Raysson Ferreira De Abreu Silva

Tournament statistics
- Matches played: 55
- Best spiker: (United States) Zachary Upp
- Best blocker: (Croatia) Ivan Cosic
- Best server: (Egypt) Elsayed Saad Moussa
- Best receiver: (Brazil) Alex Pereira Witkowski

The 2025 Sitting Volleyball World Cup – Men's event was the 6th edition of the biannual secondary world championship, contested by the senior men's national sitting volleyball teams, sanctioned by World ParaVolley. It was held in Fort Wayne, United States from 12 to 18 October 2025, marking the first time the event is held in the country and first time it was held in the Americas.

Fourteen teams took part, one more than the previous edition.

The tournament acted as qualification for the 2026 Sitting Volleyball World Championships in Hangzhou, China, with two spots available.

Iran are the defending champions, after beating Egypt 3–0 in the 2023 final in Cairo, but couldn't defend their title after not entering. Egypt won their first title after beating Brazil 3–1 in the final.

== Host selection ==
A call for the hosting rights was first said on 25 October 2024, with the deadline for submitting interest being on 30 November 2024. On 3 February 2025, American city, Fort Wayne, was given the hosting rights. This marks the first time the tournament will be in the United States and first time the event is in the Americas. The event is projected to generate $2.3 million for Allen County.

=== Quotes ===
“We are honored to work alongside WPV and Visit Fort Wayne to welcome the global Sitting ParaVolley community to Fort Wayne. Beyond the intense competition, this event exemplifies the power of inclusive sport and provides a transformational experience for our community.”

— Mike Mushett, CEO of Turnstone.

“Fort Wayne continues to be a recognized leader in hosting events that have a lasting and meaningful impact for participants and guests. We’re thrilled to welcome athletes from across the globe for this milestone opportunity for our community. The success of our local partners in securing the World Cup speaks to our city’s growing reputation as an inclusive, world-class destination for sports.”

— Sharon Tucker, mayor of Fort Wayne.

=== Preparations ===
- On 19 September 2025, tickets were released. One-day ticket passes were $15 while a tournament pass was $75.
- The deadline for obtaining media accreditation was 1 October 2025.

== Teams ==
Fourteen teams took part, one more than the previous edition. Teams had to submit an interest in entering by 1 July 2025. On 14 August 2025, the teams were revealed. Australia, Canada, Italy, Poland and Thailand will make their debut while Croatia, Kazakhstan, Netherlands and hosts United States return after not participating in the last edition. Algeria, China, Germany, Great Britain, defending champions Iran, Iraq, Rwanda and Ukraine all didn't enter after taking part in 2023.

Team	Appearance(s)					Previous best performance (Note: Bold text indicates they hosted that edition.)
Team	Total	First	Last	Streak	2023	Previous best performance
Australia	1st	Debut				
Brazil	4th	2008	2023	4	5th	Runners-up (2016)
Canada	1st	Debut				
Croatia	2nd	2012		1	N/A	Seventh place (2012)
Egypt	6th	2008	2023	6	2nd	Runners-up (2023)
France	2nd	2023		2	10th	Tenth place (2023)
India	2nd	2023		2	13th	Thirteenth place (2023)
Italy	1st	Debut				
Japan	2nd	2023		2	8th	Eighth place (2023)
Kazakhstan	4th	2010	2012	1	N/A	Fourth place (2010)
Netherlands	2nd	2012		1	N/A	Ninth place (2012)
Poland	1st	Debut				
Thailand	1st	Debut				
United States (H)	3rd	2010	2016	1	N/A	Sixth place (2016)

== Venue ==
The venue is the Plassman Athletic Center in Fort Wayne. Two courts were used for the tournament.

2025 Sitting Volleyball World Cup – Men's event is located in the United States	Fort Wayne
2025 Sitting Volleyball World Cup – Men's event is located in the United States	Plassman Athletic Center
2025 Sitting Volleyball World Cup – Men's event is located in the United States	Capacity: Unknown

== Squads ==
=== United States ===
Dan Regan (OH)
Nick Dadgostar (L)
Ben Aman (OH)
Eric Duda (OH)
Alex Wilson (OPP/OH)
Robbie Gaupp (OH)
James Stuck (S/OH)
Robbie Onusko (OH)
John Kremer (S)
Zach Upp (OH)
Jason Roberts (OH)
Brett Parks (OH)
Will Curtis (S/L)
Sam Surowiec (OH)

== Format ==
The fourteen teams play in two groups of seven where the top two will advance to the semifinals. The third and fourth place teams play in the 5–8 ranking bracket. The fifth and sixth place teams play in the 9–12 ranking bracket. The seventh place team in both groups play in the 13th place match.

== Group stage ==
- All times are local.
- The top two teams qualify for the knockout stage.
- Match won 3–0 or 3–1: 3 match points for the winner, 0 match points for the loser
- Match won 3–2: 2 match points for the winner, 1 match point for the loser

=== Tiebreakers ===
1. Number of matches won
2. Match points
3. Sets ratio
4. Points ratio
5. If the tie continues as per the point ratio between two teams, the priority is given to the team which won the match between them. When the tie in points ratio is between three or more teams, a new classification of these teams in the terms of points 1, 2, 3 and 4 is made taking into consideration only the matches in which they were opposed to each other.

=== Pool A ===
Pos	Team	Pld	W	L	Pts	SW	SL	SR	SPW	SPL	SPR	Qualification
1	Kazakhstan	6	6	0	17	18	2	9.000	481	329	1.462	Semifinals
2	United States (H)	6	5	1	16	17	4	4.250	505	401	1.259	Semifinals
3	Poland	6	4	2	12	13	8	1.625	470	422	1.114	5–8 bracket semifinals
4	Canada	6	3	3	8	10	11	0.909	463	449	1.031	5–8 bracket semifinals
5	Thailand	6	2	4	7	8	13	0.615	412	477	0.864	9–12 bracket semifinals
6	France	6	1	5	2	4	17	0.235	373	493	0.757	9–12 bracket semifinals
7	Italy	6	0	6	1	3	18	0.167	367	500	0.734	13th place match

Source: 2025 Sitting Volleyball World Cup
(H) Host

Date	Time		Score		Set 1	Set 2	Set 3	Set 4	Set 5	Total	Report
12 October	11:00	Kazakhstan	3–0	Italy	25–15	25–23	25–10			75–48	Report
12 October	13:30	United States	3–0	Thailand	25–23	25–14	25–22			75–59	Report
12 October	18:00	Canada	1–3	Poland	29–31	13–25	25–23	23–25		90–104	Report
12 October	20:00	France	3–2	Italy	22–25	25–14	25–21	23–25	17–15	112–100	Report
13 October	09:00	Kazakhstan	3–0	Poland	25–12	25–15	25–11			75–38	Report
13 October	11:00	United States	3–0	Canada	25–17	25–23	25–16			75–56	Report
13 October	18:00	France	0–3	Thailand	15–25	17–25	19–25			51–75	Report
13 October	20:00	United States	3–0	Italy	25–15	25–14	25–17			75–46	Report
14 October	11:00	Kazakhstan	3–0	Canada	25–15	25–16	25–22			75–53	Report
14 October	13:30	Thailand	3–1	Italy	25–22	25–17	13–25	25–23		88–87	Report
14 October	18:00	United States	3–1	Poland	25–19	22–25	25–21	25–20		97–85	Report
14 October	20:00	Kazakhstan	3–0	France	25–21	25–10	25–14			75–45	Report
15 October	09:00	Poland	3–0	Thailand	25–15	25–16	25–18			75–49	Report
15 October	11:00	Canada	3–0	France	25–16	25–20	25–15			75–51	Report
15 October	15:30	Poland	3–0	Italy	25–18	25–9	25–19			75–46	Report
15 October	18:00	United States	2–3	Kazakhstan	25–27	21–25	25–22	25–17	12–15	108–106	Report
15 October	20:00	Canada	3–2	Thailand	24–26	23–25	27–25	25–19	15–9	114–104	Report
16 October	09:00	Poland	3–1	France	25–12	25–18	18–25	25–10		93–65	Report
16 October	11:00	Kazakhstan	3–0	Thailand	25–15	25–8	25–14			75–37	Report
16 October	18:00	Canada	3–0	Italy	25–12	25–17	25–11			75–40	Report
16 October	20:00	United States	3–0	France	25–15	25–20	25–14			75–49	Report

=== Pool B ===
Pos	Team	Pld	W	L	Pts	SW	SL	SR	SPW	SPL	SPR	Qualification
1	Brazil	6	6	0	17	18	3	6.000	498	290	1.717	Semifinals
2	Egypt	6	5	1	15	16	4	4.000	467	296	1.578	Semifinals
3	Croatia	6	4	2	13	15	6	2.500	462	333	1.387	5–8 bracket semifinals
4	Japan	6	3	3	9	9	9	1.000	351	387	0.907	5–8 bracket semifinals
5	Netherlands	6	2	4	6	6	12	0.500	366	361	1.014	9–12 bracket semifinals
6	Australia	6	1	5	3	3	16	0.188	230	458	0.502	9–12 bracket semifinals
7	India	6	0	6	0	1	18	0.056	221	470	0.470	13th place match

Source: 2025 Sitting Volleyball World Cup

Date	Time		Score		Set 1	Set 2	Set 3	Set 4	Set 5	Total	Report
12 October	09:00	Brazil	3–0	Australia	25–6	25–2	25–7			75–15	Report
12 October	11:00	Egypt	3–0	India	25–4	25–6	25–6			75–16	Report
12 October	18:00	Japan	0–3	Croatia	15–25	11–25	16–25			42–75	Report
12 October	20:00	Netherlands	3–0	Australia	25–9	25–12	25–14			75–35	Report
13 October	11:00	Egypt	3–0	Japan	25–10	25–11	25–22			75–43	Report
13 October	13:30	Brazil	3–2	Croatia	17–25	22–25	25–18	25–14	15–8	104–90	Report
13 October	18:00	Netherlands	3–0	India	25–5	25–9	25–11			75–25	Report
13 October	20:00	Egypt	3–0	Australia	25–6	25–7	25–8			75–21	Report
14 October	09:00	Brazil	3–0	Japan	25–14	25–9	25–17			75–40	Report
14 October	11:00	India	1–3	Australia	21–25	25–20	17–25	20–25		83–95	Report
14 October	18:00	Egypt	3–1	Croatia	25–22	12–25	25–12	25–13		87–72	Report
14 October	20:00	Brazil	3–0	Netherlands	25–8	25–22	25–13			75–43	Report
15 October	09:00	Croatia	3–0	India	25–7	25–10	25–3			75–20	Report
15 October	11:00	Japan	3–0	Netherlands	25–23	26–24	25–23			76–70	Report
15 October	18:00	Croatia	3–0	Australia	25–8	25–10	25–9			75–27	Report
15 October	20:00	Egypt	1–3	Brazil	25–19	21–25	22–25	12–25		80–94	Report
16 October	09:00	Japan	3–0	Australia	25–20	25–8	25–9			75–37	Report
16 October	11:00	Croatia	3–0	Netherlands	25–14	25–20	25–19			75–53	Report
16 October	13:30	Brazil	3–0	India	25–9	25–7	25–6			75–22	Report
16 October	18:00	Egypt	3–0	Netherlands	25–22	25–13	25–15			75–50	Report
16 October	20:00	Japan	3–0	India	25–18	25–14	25–23			75–55	Report

== Knockout stage ==
=== 13th place match ===
13th place match
17 October
Italy	3
India	0

Date	Time		Score		Set 1	Set 2	Set 3	Set 4	Set 5	Total	Report
17 October	15:30	Italy	3–0	India	25–11	25–15	25–14			75–40	Report

=== 9–12 bracket ===
9–12 semifinals
17 October
Thailand	3
Australia	0
17 October
Netherlands	3
France	1

Ninth place match
17 October
Thailand	1
Netherlands	3
Eleventh place match
17 October
Australia	0
France	3

==== 9–12 semifinals ====
Date	Time		Score		Set 1	Set 2	Set 3	Set 4	Set 5	Total	Report
17 October	09:00	Netherlands	3–1	France	25–20	16–25	25–20	25–17		91–82	Report
17 October	09:00	Thailand	3–0	Australia	25–14	25–14	25–17			75–45	Report

===== Eleventh place match =====
Date	Time		Score		Set 1	Set 2	Set 3	Set 4	Set 5	Total	Report
17 October	18:00	Australia	0–3	France	16–25	12–25	17–25			45–75	Report

===== Ninth place match =====
Date	Time		Score		Set 1	Set 2	Set 3	Set 4	Set 5	Total	Report
17 October	20:00	Thailand	1–3	Netherlands	13–25	25–16	23–25	18–25		79–91	Report

=== 5–8 bracket ===
5–8 semifinals
17 October
Poland	3
Japan	0
17 October
Croatia	2
Canada	3

Fifth place match
18 October
Poland	3
Canada	2
Seventh place match
18 October
Japan	0
Croatia	3

==== 5–8 semifinals ====
Date	Time		Score		Set 1	Set 2	Set 3	Set 4	Set 5	Total	Report
17 October	11:00	Poland	3–0	Japan	25–17	25–12	25–15			75–44	Report
17 October	13:30	Canada	3–2	Croatia	19–25	25–17	11–25	25–23	15–9	95–99	Report

===== Seventh place match =====
Date	Time		Score		Set 1	Set 2	Set 3	Set 4	Set 5	Total	Report
18 October	10:00	Japan	0–3	Croatia	18–25	16–25	14–25			48–75	Report

===== Fifth place match =====
Date	Time		Score		Set 1	Set 2	Set 3	Set 4	Set 5	Total	Report
18 October	12:00	Poland	3–2	Canada	16–25	25–16	21–25	25–15	15–9	102–90	Report

=== 1–4 bracket ===
Semifinals
17 October
Kazakhstan	0
Egypt	3
17 October
Brazil	3
United States	0

Final
18 October
Egypt	3
Brazil	1
Third place
18 October
Kazakhstan	3
United States	1

==== Semifinals ====
Date	Time		Score		Set 1	Set 2	Set 3	Set 4	Set 5	Total	Report
17 October	18:00	Kazakhstan	0–3	Egypt	12–25	23–25	18–25			53–75	Report
17 October	20:00	United States	0–3	Brazil	18–25	19–25	24–26			61–76	Report

===== 3rd place match =====
Date	Time		Score		Set 1	Set 2	Set 3	Set 4	Set 5	Total	Report
18 October	12:00	Kazakhstan	3–1	United States	25–23	25–18	15–25	25–23		90–89	Report

===== Final =====
Date	Time		Score		Set 1	Set 2	Set 3	Set 4	Set 5	Total	Report
18 October	15:00	Egypt	3–1	Brazil	25–19	22–25	25–15	25–21		97–80	Report

== Final rankings ==
By being the two highest ranked teams not yet qualified for the world championship, Poland and Croatia took the two available spots.

Rank	Team
Gold medal	Egypt
Silver medal	Brazil
Bronze medal	Kazakhstan
4	United States
5	Poland
6	Canada
7	Croatia
8	Japan
9	Netherlands
10	Thailand
11	France
12	Australia
13	Italy
14	India

Team Qualified for the 2026 Sitting Volleyball World Championships

== See also ==
- 2025 Sitting Volleyball World Cup – Women's event
