= 2025 Asia and Oceania Sitting Volleyball Championships – Women's tournament =

Sitting volleyball tournament in China

2025 Asia and Oceania Sitting Volleyball Championships
Tournament details
- Host country: China
- City: Hangzhou
- Dates: 9–14 June
- Teams: 7 (from 1 confederation)
- Venue: 1 (in 1 host city)

Final positions
- Champions: China (6th title)
- Runners-up: Iran
- Third place: Japan
- Fourth place: Thailand

Tournament statistics
- Matches played: 16

The 2025 Asia and Oceania Sitting Volleyball Championships – Women's tournament is the 6th edition of the biannual continental championship, contested by the senior women's national sitting volleyball teams in the Asia and Oceania region, sanctioned by ParaVolley Asia Oceania. It was held in Hangzhou, China from 9 to 14 June 2025, marking the third time the Chinese hosted the tournament, after 2007 and 2017.

Seven teams took part, one less than the previous edition.

The tournament acted as qualification for the 2026 Sitting Volleyball World Championships in Hangzhou, China, with two spots available.

China are the defending champions, after beating Iran 3–0 in the 2023 final in Astana. China won their sixth title after beating Iran 3–0 in the final to defend their title.

== Teams ==
Seven teams took part, one less than the previous edition. Australia are present after being absent in 2023. Kazakhstan and India didn't participate after taking part in 2023.

Team	Appearance(s)					Previous best performance (Note: Bold text indicates they hosted that edition.)
Team	Total	First	Last	Streak	2024	Previous best performance
Australia	2nd	2007		1	N/A	Sixth place (2007)
China (H)	6th	2003	2023	6	1st	Champions (2003, 2007, 2017, 2019, 2023)
Iran	4th	2007	2023	2	2nd	Runners-up (2023)
Japan	6th	2003	2023	6	3rd	Runners-up (2003, 2007, 2017, 2019)
Mongolia	5th	2003	2023	2	6th	Third place (2003)
South Korea	3rd	2019	2023	3	4th	Third place (2019)
Thailand	2nd	2023		2	5th	Fifth place (2023)

== Squads ==
=== Australia ===
Simon Albury
Joanna Argaet
Eliza Ault-Connell
Charlotte Bellsmith
Natalie Horobin
Bronwyn McColl
Megan McKee
Evie Ruffle
Carly Salmon
Mikayla Tuppurainen
Rachael Williams

== Venue ==
The World ParaVolley Development Centre in Hangzhou was the venue. The venue hosted the 2017 Asia and Oceania Sitting Volleyball Championships and 2017 World ParaVolley Women's Super 6. The venue will also host the 2026 Sitting Volleyball World Championships.

2025 Asia and Oceania Sitting Volleyball Championships – Women's tournament is located in China	Hangzhou
2025 Asia and Oceania Sitting Volleyball Championships – Women's tournament is located in China	World ParaVolley Development Centre
2025 Asia and Oceania Sitting Volleyball Championships – Women's tournament is located in China	Capacity: Unknown

== Format ==
The seven teams where divided into two groups where the top two from each group advanced to the semifinals.

== Opening ceremony ==
The opening ceremony demonstrated Hangzhou's local tradition through music and dance and showcased local artists with disabilities.

== Group stage ==
- All times are local.
- Match won 3–0 or 3–1: 3 match points for the winner, 0 match points for the loser
- Match won 3–2: 2 match points for the winner, 1 match point for the loser

=== Tiebreakers ===
1. Number of matches won
2. Match points
3. Sets ratio
4. Points ratio
5. If the tie continues as per the point ratio between two teams, the priority is given to the team which won the match between them. When the tie in points ratio is between three or more teams, a new classification of these teams in the terms of points 1, 2, 3 and 4 is made taking into consideration only the matches in which they were opposed to each other.

=== Group A ===
Pos	Team	Pld	W	L	Pts	SW	SL	SR	SPW	SPL	SPR	Qualification
1	China (H)	2	2	0	6	6	0	MAX	150	49	3.061	Semifinals
2	Thailand	2	1	1	3	3	3	1.000	102	126	0.810	Semifinals
3	South Korea	2	0	2	0	0	6	0.000	73	150	0.487	Fifth place bracket

Source: 2025 Asia and Oceania Sitting Volleyball Championships
(H) Host

Date	Time		Score		Set 1	Set 2	Set 3	Set 4	Set 5	Total	Report
9 June	09:00	Thailand	3–0	South Korea	25–17	25–20	25–14			75–51	Report
10 June	14:00	China	3–0	Thailand	25–1	25–17	25–9			75–27	Report
11 June	09:00	South Korea	0–3	China	6–25	9–25	7–25			22–75	Report

=== Group B ===
Pos	Team	Pld	W	L	Pts	SW	SL	SR	SPW	SPL	SPR	Qualification
1	Iran	3	3	0	9	9	0	MAX	225	90	2.500	Semifinals
2	Japan	3	2	1	6	6	3	2.000	197	126	1.563	Semifinals
3	Mongolia	3	1	2	3	3	6	0.500	126	175	0.720	Fifth place bracket
4	Australia	3	0	3	0	0	9	0.000	68	225	0.302	Fifth place bracket

Source: 2025 Asia and Oceania Sitting Volleyball Championships

Date	Time		Score		Set 1	Set 2	Set 3	Set 4	Set 5	Total	Report
9 June	11:00	Iran	3–0	Australia	25–5	25–7	25–6			75–18	Report
9 June	14:00	Japan	3–0	Mongolia	25–6	25–9	25–11			75–26	Report
10 June	09:00	Australia	0–3	Mongolia	3–25	17–25	5–25			25–75	Report
10 June	11:00	Iran	3–0	Japan	25–8	25–17	25–22			75–47	Report
11 June	11:00	Japan	3–0	Australia	25–5	25–16	25–4			75–25	Report
11 June	14:00	Mongolia	0–3	Iran	4–25	8–25	13–25			25–75	Report

== Knockout stage ==
Semifinals
13 June
China	3
Japan	0
13 June
Iran	3
Thailand	0

Final
14 June
China	3
Iran	0
Third place
14 June
Japan	3
Thailand	0

=== Semi finals ===
Date	Time		Score		Set 1	Set 2	Set 3	Set 4	Set 5	Total	Report
13 June	11:00	China	3–0	Japan	25–8	25–10	25–23			75–41	Report
13 June	14:00	Iran	3–0	Thailand	25–17	25–8	25–11			75–36	Report

=== 3rd place match ===
Date	Time		Score		Set 1	Set 2	Set 3	Set 4	Set 5	Total	Report
14 June	11:00	Japan	3–0	Thailand	25–20	25–20	25–11			75–51	

=== Final ===
Date	Time		Score		Set 1	Set 2	Set 3	Set 4	Set 5	Total	Report
14 June	13:30	China	3–0	Iran	25–17	25–17	25–17			75–51	

=== 5–7th placement group ===
Pos	Team	Pld	W	L	Pts	SW	SL	SR	SPW	SPL	SPR	Qualification
5	Mongolia	2	2	0	5	6	2	3.000	179	135	1.326	Fifth place
6	South Korea	2	1	1	4	5	3	1.667	177	128	1.383	Sixth place
7	Australia	2	0	2	0	0	6	0.000	57	150	0.380	Seventh place

Date	Time		Score		Set 1	Set 2	Set 3	Set 4	Set 5	Total	Report
13 June	09:00	Mongolia	3–0	Australia	25–10	25–12	25–11			75–33	Report
13 June	16:00	South Korea	2–3	Mongolia	23–25	25–21	25–18	19–25	10–15	102–104	Report
14 June	09:00	Australia	0–3	South Korea	9–25	1–25	14–25			24–75	

== Final rankings ==
By finishing as the top two teams beside world championship hosts China, Iran and Japan qualified for the world championship. Thailand achieved their best result, placing fourth.

Rank	Team
Gold medal	China
Silver medal	Iran
Bronze medal	Japan
4	Thailand
5	Mongolia
6	South Korea
7	Australia

Team Qualified for the 2026 Sitting Volleyball World Championships

== See also ==
- 2025 Asia and Oceania Sitting Volleyball Championships – Men's tournament
