= 2025 Pan American Sitting Volleyball Championships – Men's tournament =

Sitting volleyball tournament in United States

2025 Pan American Sitting Volleyball Championships

Tournament details
- Host country: United States
- City: Denver
- Dates: 24–28 May
- Teams: 4 (from 1 confederation)
- Venue: 1 (in 1 host city)

Final positions
- Champions: [[ men's national sitting volleyball team|]] (5th title)
- Runners-up: [[ men's national sitting volleyball team|]]
- Third place: [[ men's national sitting volleyball team|]]
- Fourth place: [[ men's national sitting volleyball team|]]

Tournament statistics
- Matches played: 10
- Best attacker: (United States) Zach Upp
- Best spiker: (United States) Zach Upp
- Best receiver: (United States) James Stuck

The 2025 Pan American Sitting Volleyball Championships – Men's tournament is the 5th edition of the biannual continental championship, contested by the senior men's national sitting volleyball teams in the Americas region, sanctioned by ParaVolley Pan America. It was held in Denver, United States from 24 to 28 May 2025, marking the third time the event is held in the country.

Four teams took part, the same as the previous edition.

The tournament acted as qualification for the 2026 Sitting Volleyball World Championships in Hangzhou, China, with two spots available.

Brazil are the defending champions, after beating United States 3–0 in the 2023 final in Edmonton. Brazil defended their title after beating United States 3–2 in the final to win their fourth title.

== Host selection ==
On 5 November 2024, Denver, United States were given the hosting rights. This was the third time the event was held in the United States, after 2009 and 2013. The event was organised alongside the 2025 USA Volleyball Open National Championship.

=== Quotes ===
“We’re pleased to hold the zonal championship in the United States. This is an excellent opportunity to showcase sitting volleyball to the U.S. audience as we look ahead to both teams competing at LA2028.”

— USA Volleyball president and CEO John Speraw.

“I’m thrilled that USA Volleyball has agreed to host the 2025 ParaVolley Pan America Sitting Volleyball Zonal Championships. This event is of great significance to the Pan America Zone, as it will provide the top two teams in each gender the opportunity to secure a spot in the 2026 World Championships. Equally important, every participating team will earn valuable World Ranking Points, further enhancing their standing on the global stage. We look forward to an exciting and competitive tournament.”

— Joe Campbell, president of ParaVolley Pan America.

== Teams ==
Four teams took part, the same as the previous edition. Teams arrived on 21 May and departed on 29 May.

Team	Appearance(s)					Previous best performance (Note: Bold text indicates they hosted that edition.)
Team	Total	First	Last	Streak	2023	Previous best performance
Argentina	2nd	2023		2	4th	Fourth place (2023)
Brazil	5th	2010	2023	5	1st	Champions (2013, 2017, 2023)
Canada	5th	2010	2023	5	3rd	Third place (2010, 2013, 2017, 2023)
United States (H)	5th	2010	2023	5	2nd	Champions (2010)

== Squads ==
=== United States ===
Dan Regan (OH)
Nick Dadgostar (L)
Ben Aman (OH)
Eric Duda (S/OH)
Alex Wilson (OPP/OH)
Robbie Gaupp (OH)
James Stuck (S/OH)
Robbie Onusko (OH)
Roderick Green (MB)
John Kremer (L)
Zach Upp (OH)
Jason Roberts (OH)
Brett Parks (OH)
Will Curtis (S/L)

== Venue ==
The tournament was held at the Colorado Convention Center in Denver. The multi-purpose convention center was built in 1990 but expanded in 2004.

2025 Pan American Sitting Volleyball Championships – Men's tournament is located in the United States	Denver
2025 Pan American Sitting Volleyball Championships – Men's tournament is located in the United States	Colorado Convention Center
2025 Pan American Sitting Volleyball Championships – Men's tournament is located in the United States	Capacity: unknown

== Format ==
The four teams play each other in a round robin format, where every team advances to the semi finals. In the semi finals, first plays fourth and second plays third. The two winners play the final, while the losers play for third place.

== Group stage ==
- The schedule was announced on 29 April 2025.
- All times are local.
- Match won 3–0 or 3–1: 3 match points for the winner, 0 match points for the loser
- Match won 3–2: 2 match points for the winner, 1 match point for the loser

=== Tiebreakers ===
1. Number of matches won
2. Match points
3. Sets ratio
4. Points ratio
5. If the tie continues as per the point ratio between two teams, the priority is given to the team which won the match between them. When the tie in points ratio is between three or more teams, a new classification of these teams in the terms of points 1, 2, 3 and 4 is made taking into consideration only the matches in which they were opposed to each other.

Pos	Team	Pld	W	L	Pts	SW	SL	SR	SPW	SPL	SPR
1	Brazil	3	3	0	9	9	0	MAX	227	165	1.376
2	United States	3	2	1	6	6	5	1.200	277	243	1.140
3	Canada	3	1	2	3	4	6	0.667	218	234	0.932
4	Argentina	3	0	3	0	1	9	0.111	168	248	0.677

Source: 2025 Pan American Sitting Volleyball Championships

Date	Time		Score		Set 1	Set 2	Set 3	Set 4	Set 5	Total	Report
24 May	12:00	Brazil	3–0	Canada	25–11	25–16	25–23			75–50	Report
24 May	15:00	United States	3–1	Argentina	23–25	25–15	25–14	25–19		98–73	Report
25 May	12:00	Brazil	3–0	Argentina	25–17	25–18	25–9			75–44	Report
25 May	15:00	United States	3–1	Canada	25–22	25–20	33–35	25–16		108–93	Report
26 May	12:00	Canada	3–0	Argentina	25–10	25–22	25–19			75–51	Report
26 May	15:00	United States	0–3	Brazil	23–25	25–27	23–25			71–77	Report

== Knockout stage ==
Semifinals
27 May
Brazil	3
Argentina	0
27 May
United States	3
Canada	2

Final
28 May
Brazil	3
United States	2
Third place
28 May
Argentina	0
Canada	3

=== Semi finals ===
Date	Time		Score		Set 1	Set 2	Set 3	Set 4	Set 5	Total	Report
27 May	10:00	Brazil	3–0	Argentina	25–13	25–11	25–10			75–34	Report
27 May	12:00	United States	3–2	Canada	20–25	25–23	25–20	20–25	15–12	105–105	Report

=== 3rd place match ===
Date	Time		Score		Set 1	Set 2	Set 3	Set 4	Set 5	Total	Report
28 May	10:00	Argentina	0–3	Canada	17–25	19–25	16–25			52–75	Report

=== Final ===
Date	Time		Score		Set 1	Set 2	Set 3	Set 4	Set 5	Total	Report
28 May	12:00	Brazil	3–2	United States	25–9	19–25	15–25	25–22	15–12	99–93	Report

== Final rankings ==
As winners of the 2024 Paralympics and 2028 Paralympic hosts, United States already qualified automatically, thereby the second world championship spot was given to Canada.

Rank	Team
Gold medal	Brazil
Silver medal	United States
Bronze medal	Canada
4	Argentina

Team Qualified for the 2026 Sitting Volleyball World Championships

== See also ==
- 2025 Pan American Sitting Volleyball Championships – Women's tournament
