= 2025 Asia and Oceania Sitting Volleyball Championships – Men's tournament =

Sitting volleyball tournament in China

2025 Asia and Oceania Sitting Volleyball Championships
Tournament details
- Host country: China
- City: Hangzhou
- Dates: 9–14 June
- Teams: 8 (from 1 confederation)
- Venue: 1 (in 1 host city)

Final positions
- Champions: Kazakhstan (1st title)
- Runners-up: China
- Third place: Thailand
- Fourth place: Japan

Tournament awards
- Best Libero: (Kazakhstan) Shyngys Medeuov

Tournament statistics
- Matches played: 20
- Best blocker: (Kazakhstan) Almat Ospanov
- Best server: (Kazakhstan) Erik Kaskabayev

The 2025 Asia and Oceania Sitting Volleyball Championships – Men's tournament is the 6th edition of the biannual continental championship, contested by the senior men's national sitting volleyball teams in the Asia and Oceania region, sanctioned by ParaVolley Asia Oceania. It was held in Hangzhou, China from 9 to 14 June 2025, marking the second time the Chinese hosted the tournament, after 2017.

Eight teams took part, one more than the previous edition.

The tournament acted as qualification for the 2026 Sitting Volleyball World Championships in Hangzhou, China, with two spots available.

Iran are the defending champions, after beating Kazakhstan 3–0 in the 2023 final in Astana, but couldn't defend their title as they didn't enter. Kazakhstan won their first title after beating China 3–2 in the final.

== Teams ==
Eight teams took part, one more than the previous edition. Mongolia and Saudi Arabia make their debut while Australia and Thailand are present after being absent in 2023. India, defending champions Iran and Iraq didn't participate after taking part in 2023.

Team	Appearance(s)					Previous best performance (Note: Bold text indicates they hosted that edition.)
Team	Total	First	Last	Streak	2024	Previous best performance
Australia	2nd	1999		1	N/A	Fourth place (1999)
China (H)	5th	1999	2023	5	3rd	Runners-up (2019)
Japan	5th	1999	2023	5	6th	Champions (1999)
Kazakhstan	5th	1995	2023	6	2nd	Runners-up (2017, 2023)
Mongolia	1st	Debut				
Saudi Arabia	1st	Debut				
South Korea	4th	1999	2023	3	5th	Runner-up (1999)
Thailand	2nd	2019		1	N/A	Fourth place (1999)

== Squads ==
=== Australia ===
Simon Albury
Bradley Barclay
Damian Byrnes
Matthew Cameron
Jayden Coffey
Japhy Duldig
Nicholas Kaiser
Glenn Pyne
Adam Smark
Shannan Sykes

== Venue ==
The World ParaVolley Development Centre in Hangzhou was the venue. The venue hosted the 2017 Asia and Oceania Sitting Volleyball Championships and 2017 World ParaVolley Women's Super 6. The venue will also host the 2026 Sitting Volleyball World Championships.

2025 Asia and Oceania Sitting Volleyball Championships – Men's tournament is located in China	Hangzhou
2025 Asia and Oceania Sitting Volleyball Championships – Men's tournament is located in China	World ParaVolley Development Centre
2025 Asia and Oceania Sitting Volleyball Championships – Men's tournament is located in China	Capacity: Unknown

== Format ==
The eight teams where divided into two groups where the top two from each group advanced to the semifinals.

== Opening ceremony ==
The opening ceremony demonstrated Hangzhou's local tradition through music and dance and showcased local artists with disabilities.

== Group stage ==
- All times are local.
- Match won 3–0 or 3–1: 3 match points for the winner, 0 match points for the loser
- Match won 3–2: 2 match points for the winner, 1 match point for the loser

=== Tiebreakers ===
1. Number of matches won
2. Match points
3. Sets ratio
4. Points ratio
5. If the tie continues as per the point ratio between two teams, the priority is given to the team which won the match between them. When the tie in points ratio is between three or more teams, a new classification of these teams in the terms of points 1, 2, 3 and 4 is made taking into consideration only the matches in which they were opposed to each other.

=== Group A ===
Pos	Team	Pld	W	L	Pts	SW	SL	SR	SPW	SPL	SPR	Qualification
1	China	3	3	0	9	9	0	MAX	225	108	2.083	Semifinals
2	Thailand	3	2	1	6	6	4	1.500	213	204	1.044	Semifinals
3	South Korea	3	1	2	3	4	6	0.667	199	193	1.031	Fifth place bracket
4	Mongolia	3	0	3	0	0	9	0.000	93	225	0.413	Fifth place bracket

Source: 2025 Asia and Oceania Sitting Volleyball Championships

Date	Time		Score		Set 1	Set 2	Set 3	Set 4	Set 5	Total	Report
9 June	09:00	China	3–0	Mongolia	25–8	25–4	25–11			75–23	Report
9 June	11:00	South Korea	1–3	Thailand	25–19	19–25	14–25	24–26		82–95	Report
10 June	14:00	Mongolia	0–3	Thailand	8–25	17–25	22–25			47–75	Report
10 June	16:00	China	3–0	South Korea	25–11	25–16	25–15			75–42	Report
11 June	09:00	South Korea	3–0	Mongolia	25–10	25–7	25–6			75–23	Report
11 June	11:00	Thailand	0–3	China	13–25	13–25	17–25			43–75	Report

=== Group B ===
Pos	Team	Pld	W	L	Pts	SW	SL	SR	SPW	SPL	SPR	Qualification
1	Kazakhstan	3	3	0	9	9	0	MAX	225	104	2.163	Semifinals
2	Japan	3	2	1	6	6	3	2.000	197	142	1.387	Semifinals
3	Australia	3	1	2	2	3	8	0.375	215	263	0.817	Fifth place bracket
4	Saudi Arabia	3	0	3	1	2	9	0.222	170	263	0.646	Fifth place bracket

Source: 2025 Asia and Oceania Sitting Volleyball Championships

Date	Time		Score		Set 1	Set 2	Set 3	Set 4	Set 5	Total	Report
9 June	14:00	Kazakhstan	3–0	Saudi Arabia	25–13	25–8	25–9			75–30	Report
9 June	16:00	Japan	3–0	Australia	25–14	25–14	25–12			75–40	Report
10 June	09:00	Saudi Arabia	2–3	Australia	25–27	22–25	25–23	25–20	16–18	113–113	Report
10 June	11:00	Kazakhstan	3–0	Japan	25–18	25–13	25–16			75–47	Report
11 June	14:00	Japan	3–0	Saudi Arabia	25–7	25–12	25–8			75–27	Report
11 June	16:00	Australia	0–3	Kazakhstan	5–25	11–25	11–25			27–75	Report

== Knockout stage ==
Semifinals
13 June
China	3
Japan	1
13 June
Kazakhstan	3
Thailand	0

Final
14 June
China	2
Kazakhstan	3
Third place
14 June
Japan	2
Thailand	3

=== Semi finals ===
Date	Time		Score		Set 1	Set 2	Set 3	Set 4	Set 5	Total	Report
13 June	14:00	China	3–1	Japan	25–18	21–25	25–23	25–17		96–83	Report
13 June	16:00	Kazakhstan	3–0	Thailand	25–15	25–15	25–5			75–35	Report

=== 3rd place match ===
Date	Time		Score		Set 1	Set 2	Set 3	Set 4	Set 5	Total	Report
14 June	13:30	Japan	2–3	Thailand	25–16	26–24	18–25	21–25	11–15	101–105	

=== Final ===
Date	Time		Score		Set 1	Set 2	Set 3	Set 4	Set 5	Total	Report
14 June	15:30	China	2–3	Kazakhstan	25–22	25–19	19–25	20–25	8–15	97–106	Report

=== Fifth place bracket ===
5–8 Semifinals
13 June
South Korea	3
Saudi Arabia	0
13 June
Australia	0
Mongolia	3

5th place match
14 June
South Korea	3
Mongolia	0
7th place match
14 June
Saudi Arabia	0
Australia	3

=== Fifth place semifinals ===
Date	Time		Score		Set 1	Set 2	Set 3	Set 4	Set 5	Total	Report
13 June	09:00	South Korea	3–0	Saudi Arabia	25–14	25–11	25–8			75–33	Report
13 June	11:00	Australia	0–3	Mongolia	23–25	20–25	15–25			58–75	Report

=== 7th place match ===
Date	Time		Score		Set 1	Set 2	Set 3	Set 4	Set 5	Total	Report
14 June	09:00	Saudi Arabia	0–3	Australia	13–25	22–25	22–25			57–75	

=== 5th place match ===
Date	Time		Score		Set 1	Set 2	Set 3	Set 4	Set 5	Total	Report
14 June	11:00	South Korea	3–0	Mongolia	25–8	25–14	25–10			75–32	

== Final rankings ==
By finishing as the top two teams beside world championship hosts China, Kazakhstan and Thailand qualified for the world championship.

Rank	Team
Gold medal	Kazakhstan
Silver medal	China
Bronze medal	Thailand
4	Japan
5	South Korea
6	Mongolia
7	Australia
8	Saudi Arabia

Team Qualified for the 2026 Sitting Volleyball World Championships

== See also ==
- 2025 Asia and Oceania Sitting Volleyball Championships – Women's tournament
