= Emma Schieck =

American sitting volleyball player (born 2001)

Personal information
- Full name: Emma Joyce Schieck
- Born: August 6, 2001 (age 24)
- Height: 5 ft 7 in (170 cm)

Sport
- Sport: Sitting volleyball
Medal record
Women's sitting volleyball
Representing the United States
Paralympic Games
Gold medal – first place	2020 Tokyo	Team
Gold medal – first place	2024 Paris	Team
World Championship
Bronze medal – third place	2022 Sarajevo	Team

Emma Joyce Schieck (born August 6, 2001) is an American sitting volleyball player. She made her Paralympics debut during the 2020 Summer Paralympics, where she helped Team USA win a gold medal.

== Early life ==
Schieck was born on August 6, 2001, to parents Charles and Elizabeth Schieck, and followed by her siblings, Alex, Abby, and Thomas. As a result of birth complications, she sustained nerve damage which caused brachial plexus injury. Growing up, she played soccer but soon switched to volleyball. While playing for South Iredell High School and the Precision Athletics Volleyball Club, she was approached by two referees about considering sitting volleyball. One of the referees was Elliot Blake, Team USA's sitting volleyball manager, who encouraged Schieck to attend an informal tryout session in Virginia.

== Career ==
In August 2021, Schieck was named to Team USA's National Sitting Volleyball Team to compete at the 2020 Summer Paralympics. Schieck made her Paralympics debut in a 75–31 win against Rwanda on August 27, 2021. In the gold-medal game against China, Schieck scored the final point to help Team USA win in four sets. Following the Games, she returned to school at the University of North Carolina at Chapel Hill.
