= Liliane Mukobwanakawe =

Rwandese Paralympic volleyballer

Personal information
- Full name: Liliane Mukobwanakawe
- Nationality: Rwandese
- Born: January 6, 1989 (age 37); Kamonyi District, Rwanda
- Hometown: Kigali, Rwanda
Medal record
Women's sitting volleyball
Representing Rwanda
Women's African Volleyball Championship
Gold medal – first place	2015 Women's African Volleyball Championship	Team
Women's African Volleyball Championship
Gold medal – first place	2019 Women's African Volleyball Championship	Team

Lilian Mukobwanakawe (born 6 January 1989) is a Rwandan Paralympic volleyballer who as of 2019 serves as the captain of the Rwanda Women Sitting Volleyball team. She was captain of the 2015 and 2019 ParaVolley Africa Sitting Volleyball Championships winning teams.

== Background and education ==
Mukobwanakawe is the last of seven children born to Emmanuel Karangwa and Agnes Uwiregye in Kamonyi District, Southern Province, Rwanda. She attended Remera Catholic School for her primary education before joining ASPAD Ngororero for Ordinary level and completed her Advanced level in 2009 at Saint Bernadette still in Kamonyi District.

Mukobwanakawe was born with full function of her limbs but sustained an accident at the age of seven that left her with a broken right femur. She did not realise it was serious because she could still walk freely and play basketball. Later on in high school, she sustained a further injury during an inter-school basketball competition and since 2005, has not been able to walk without the aid of crutches.

== Career ==
According to the New Times, a Rwandese daily, Mukobwanakawe was introduced to sitting volleyball, a sport in the Paralympic Games, in 2007, and was recruited by a team called Imena. She left Imena a year later and joined the Nyarugenge-based Troupe Handicapee Tuzuzanye (THT) Club where she also played for one year before crossing to Intwari in Kicukiro where she was appointed captain and later the club vice president, roles she holds to date.

She has since gone ahead to represent her country at the 2016 Intercontinental and World ParaVolley Championship was held between March 17-23 in Hangzhou City, China.

=== Paralympic qualification ===
Mukobwanakawe made her Paralympic debut at the 2016 Rio Olympics after being a part of.

She is part of the Rwanda Women Sitting Volleyball Team that qualified for the Tokyo 2020 Summer Paralympics after the final round of the 2019 African Sitting Volleyball Championships by beating Egypt 3-1(25-22, 26-28, 15-25, 18-25) at Amahoro Petit Stadium.

Individual awards

She was voted the best spiker at 2019 African Sitting Volleyball Championships.

== See also ==
- Results for Liliane Mukobwanakawe from the International Paralympic Committee
- Rwanda at the 2020 Summer Paralympics
